= List of local communities in Novi Sad =

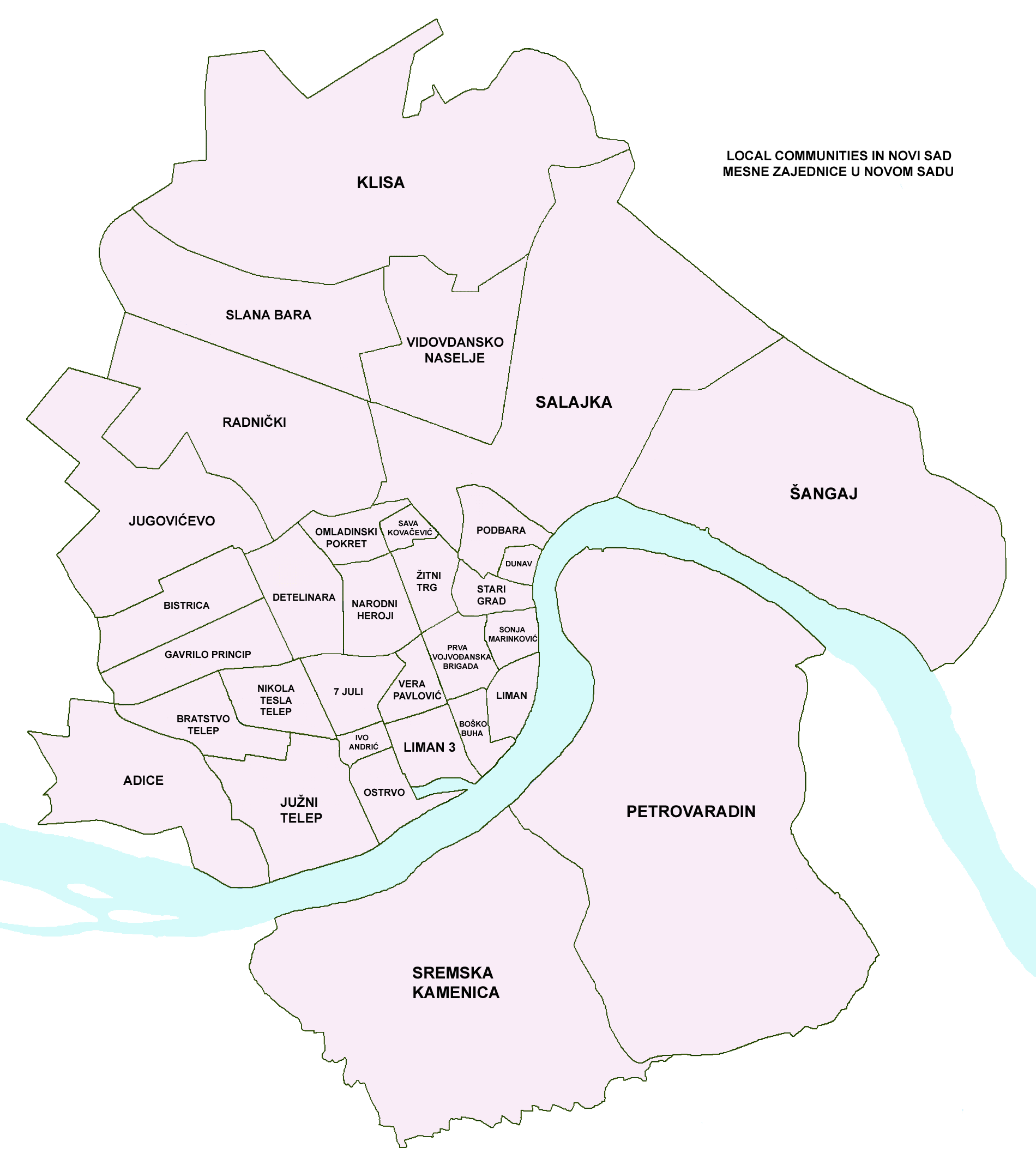
Map of local communities in urban part of Novi Sad

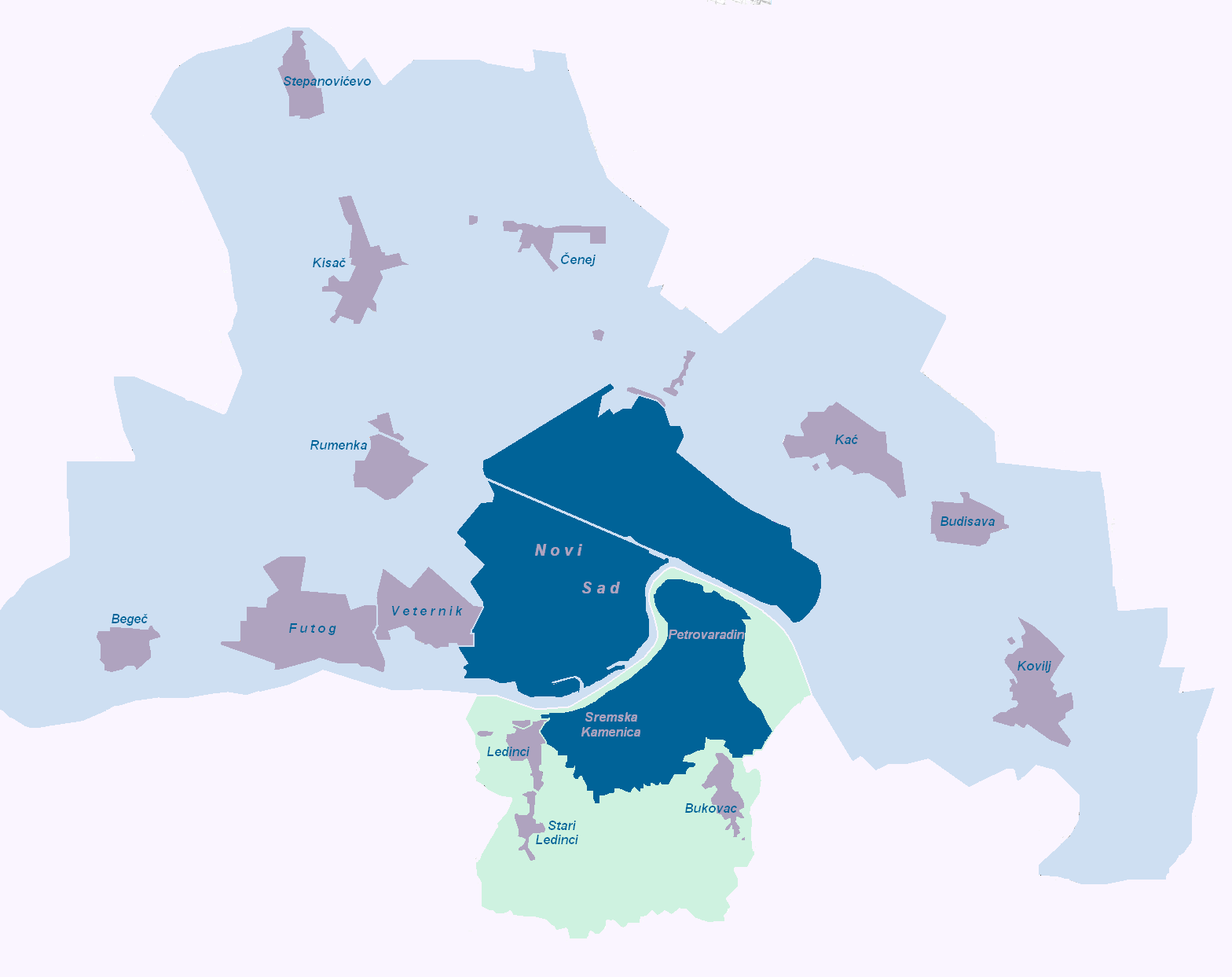
Map of local communities in the outskirts of Novi Sad

List of local communities in Novi Sad:

- in Novi Sad urban municipality
- in Petrovaradin urban municipality

	Name of the local community	Local community presidents	Neighborhoods and suburbs of Novi Sad
1	Žitni Trg	Radojka Jokanić	Rotkvarija
2	Stari Grad	Kristina Žarić	Stari Grad
3	Prva Vojvođanska Brigada	Sandra Žepinić	Stari Grad
4	Sonja Marinković	Lazar Pavlović	Stari Grad
5	Liman	Dragoljub Perković	Liman I, University campus
6	Boško Buha	Branislav Jovović	Liman II
7	Liman III	Hana Ljiljak	Liman III
8	Ostrvo	Dušan Penezić	Liman IV
9	Ivo Andrić	Aleksandra Tadijin	Liman IV
10	Vera Pavlović	Vojislav Joksović	Grbavica
11	7. juli	Zora Purić	Adamovićevo Naselje, Grbavica
12	Južni Telep	Dragan Kosovac	Telep
13	Bratstvo-Telep	Aleksandar Ilić	Telep
14	Nikola Tesla-Telep	Marija Pajović	Telep
15	Gavrilo Princip	Jovan Dragić	Bistrica, Satelit
16	Bistrica	Vukašin Milović	Bistrica
17	Adice	Vasilija Bojić	Adice
18	Jugovićevo	Đuro Šušnjar	Jugovićevo, Avijatičarsko Naselje, Sajlovo
19	Radnički	Jovan Vojnović	Detelinara
20	Detelinara	Radojica Graovac	Detelinara
21	Narodni Heroji	Ranka Malešević	Sajmište
22	Omladinski pokret	Čedo Gromilić	Banatić
23	Sava Kovačević	Vanja Momčilović	Rotkvarija
24	Dunav	Milan Ilić	Podbara
25	Podbara	Srba Jankov	Podbara
26	Slana Bara	Dejan Šijak	Slana Bara
27	Klisa	Dragan Hemon	Klisa
28	Vidovdansko naselje	Drago Stojičić	Vidovdansko Naselje
29	Salajka	Maja Matić	Salajka
30	Šangaj	Saša Kitanović	Šangaj
31	Petrovaradin	Dražen Malobabić	Petrovaradin
32	Sremska Kamenica	Donald Božić	Sremska Kamenica
33	Bukovac	Zoran Sladojević	Bukovac
34	Ledinci	Strahinja Stanković	Ledinci
35	Stari Ledinci	Tijana Marjanović	Stari Ledinci
36	Kać	Ostoja Drinić	Kać
37	Budisava	Jasna Daničić	Budisava
38	Kovilj	Sanja Samočeta	Kovilj
39	Rumenka	Momir Mišković	Rumenka
40	Kisač	Jan Vozar	Kisač
41	Stepanovićevo	Mlađan Biga	Stepanovićevo
42	Veternik	Jasmina Rakić	Veternik
43	Futog	Zoran Crepulja	Futog
44	Begeč	Milan Tatić	Begeč
45	Čenej	Miloš Vilotijević	Čenej
46	Pejićevi Salaši-Nemanovci	Zoran Podunavac	Pejićevi Salaši, Nemanovci
47	Sajlovo	Dejan Latinović	Sajlovo
