= Jugovićevo Airfield =

Defunct airfield in Novi Sad, Serbia

Jugovićevo Airfield Аеродром Југовићево
- IATA: none; ICAO: none

Summary
- Airport type: Military
- Serves: Novi Sad, Serbia
- Built: 1913

Jugovićevo Airfield (Serbian: Аеродром Југовићево) is a former military airport on the outskirts of Novi Sad, built in 1913, to serve the airforce of the Austria-Hungary empire, near the Subotica–Novi Sad railway, west of the earlier airport near Sajlovo.

Since the mid-1950s, Jugovićevo has been losing its military importance. Today, the airfield is not in operation.
