= Detelinara =

Detelinara Детелинара
- Urban neighborhood
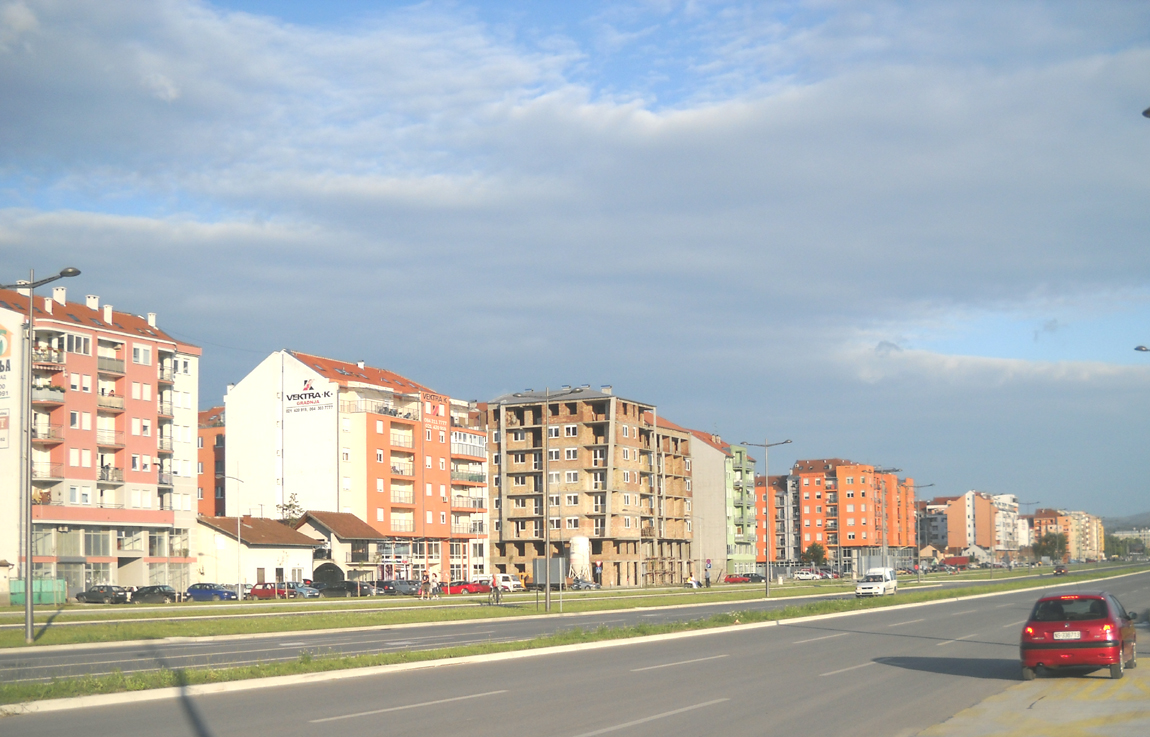
- Detelinara, Subotica Boulevard (Boulevard of Europe)
- Country: Serbia
- Province: Vojvodina
- District: South Bačka
- Municipality: Novi Sad
- Time zone: UTC+1 (CET)
  - Summer (DST): UTC+2 (CEST)
- Area code: +381(0)21
- Car plates: NS

Detelinara (Serbian: Детелинара, from Serbian detelina - clover, hence Detelinara = Field of Clovers) is an urban neighborhood of the city of Novi Sad, Serbia.

== Borders ==
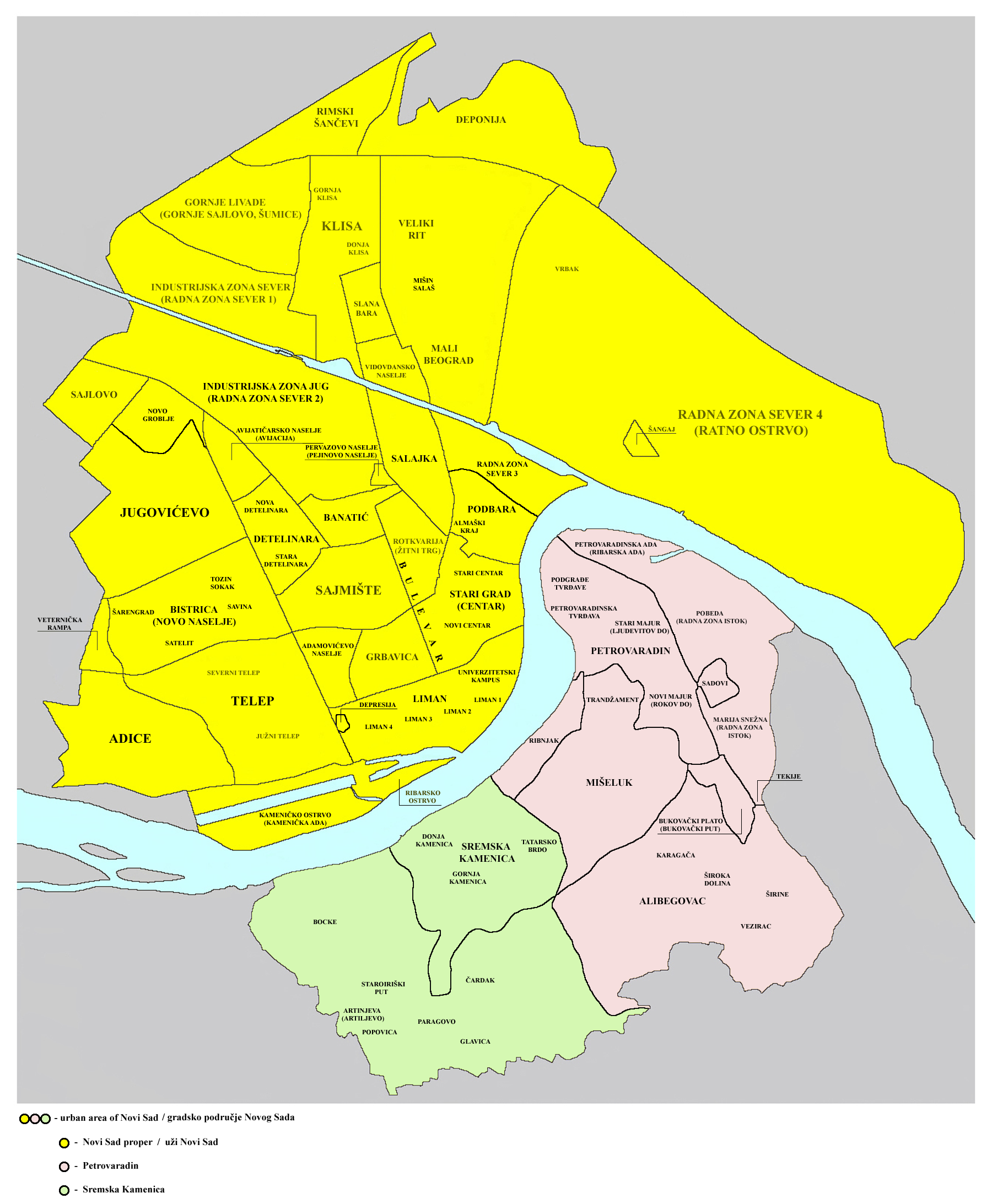
Map of the urban area of Novi Sad with city quarters, showing the location of Detelinara

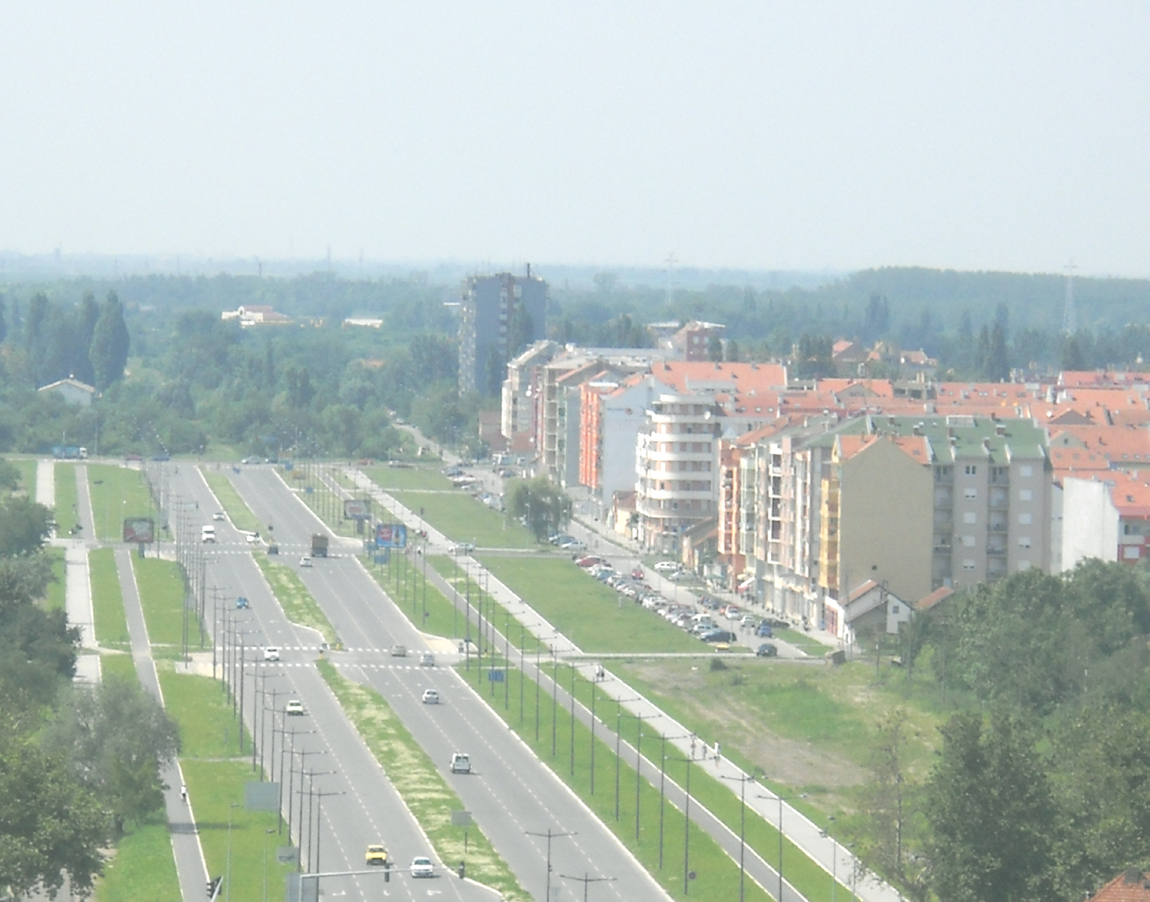
Panoramic view of Detelinara and Subotica Boulevard (Boulevard of Europe)

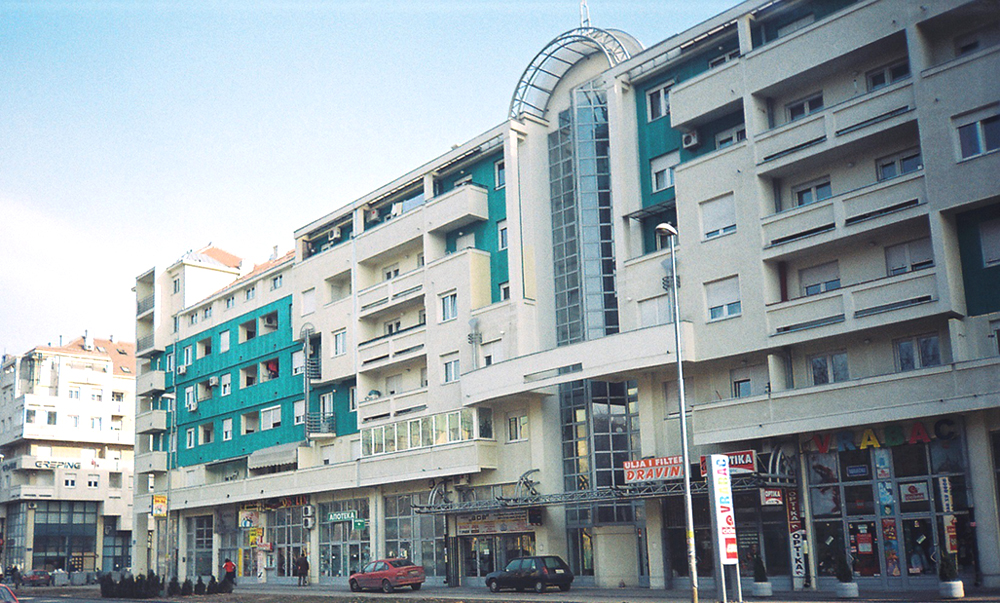
Detelinara, Kornelija Stankovića Street

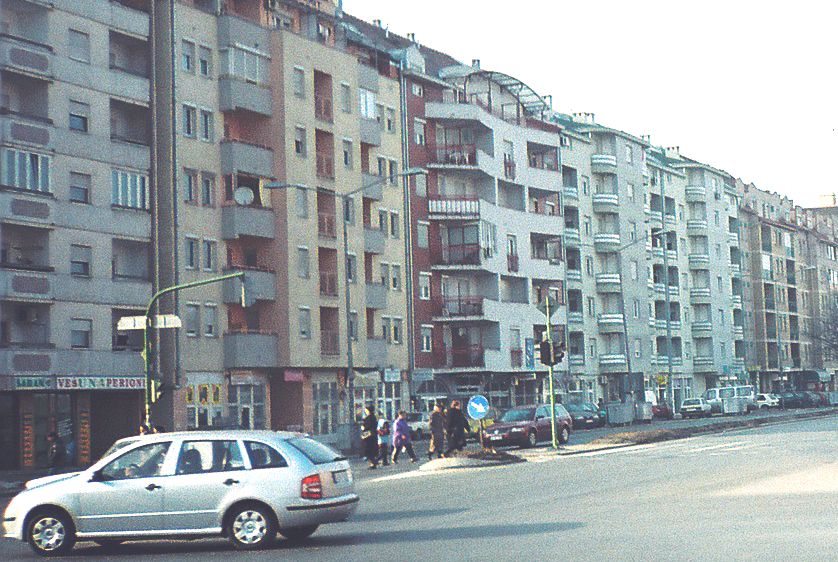
Detelinara, Rumenačka Street

The south-eastern borders of Detelinara are Ulica Branka Bajića (Branko Bajić Street) and Ulica Braće Popović (Braće Popović Street), the north-eastern border is Rumenačka ulica (Rumenačka Street), the northern border is Ulica Oblačića Rada (Oblačića Rada Street), and the western border is Bulevar Evrope (Boulevard of Europe), built in the last quarter of 2009.

== Neighbouring city quarters ==
The neighbouring city quarters are: Novo Naselje and Jugovićevo in the west, Avijatičarsko Naselje in the north, Sajmište in the south-east, and Banatić and Industrijska Zona Jug in the north-east.

== Parts of Detelinara ==
Detelinara is divided into Stara Detelinara (Old Detelinara) and Nova Detelinara (New Detelinara). The border between these two parts of the settlement is Ulica Kornelija Stankovića (Kornelije Stanković Street). Old Detelinara is located on the southern side of this Street, while New Detelinara is located on the northern side. But due to rapid construction of new apartment buildings on the southern side in practice, the southern side is called New and the northern Old.

== Sports ==
The FK Novi Sad stadium holds 6.000 people.

== History ==
Between 1980 and 1989, Detelinara was one of the seven municipalities of Novi Sad City. The municipality included the city quarters of Detelinara, Sajmište, Banatić, Avijatičarsko Naselje, Jugovićevo, Industrijska Zona Jug, Industrijska Zona Sever, Gornje Livade and Rimski Šančevi, and the villages of Rumenka, Kisač, and Stepanovićevo.

During bombing of Novi Sad in 1999, NATO bombs devastated civilian residential buildings on the Ulica Ðule Molnara (Djule Molnara street) and a school in Detelinara.

There were no human casualties.

== Gallery ==
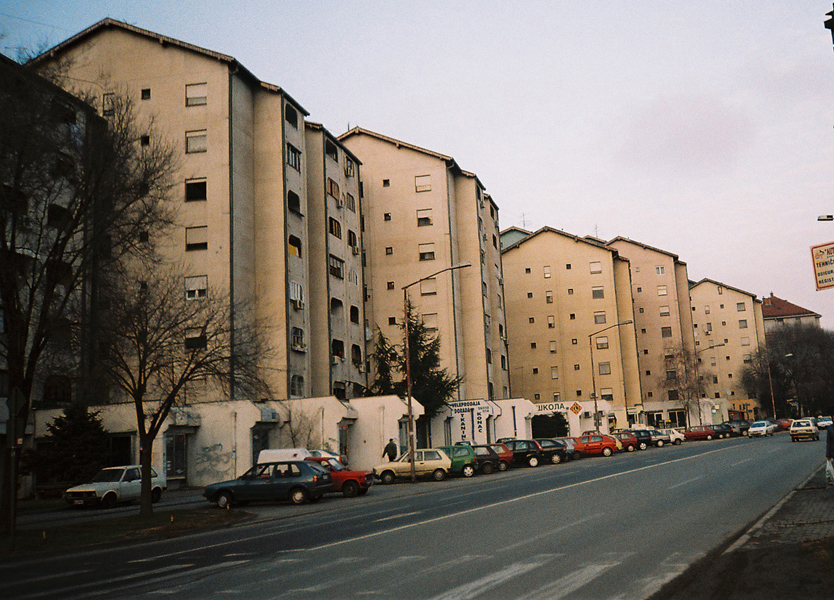
Detelinara, Braće Popović Street

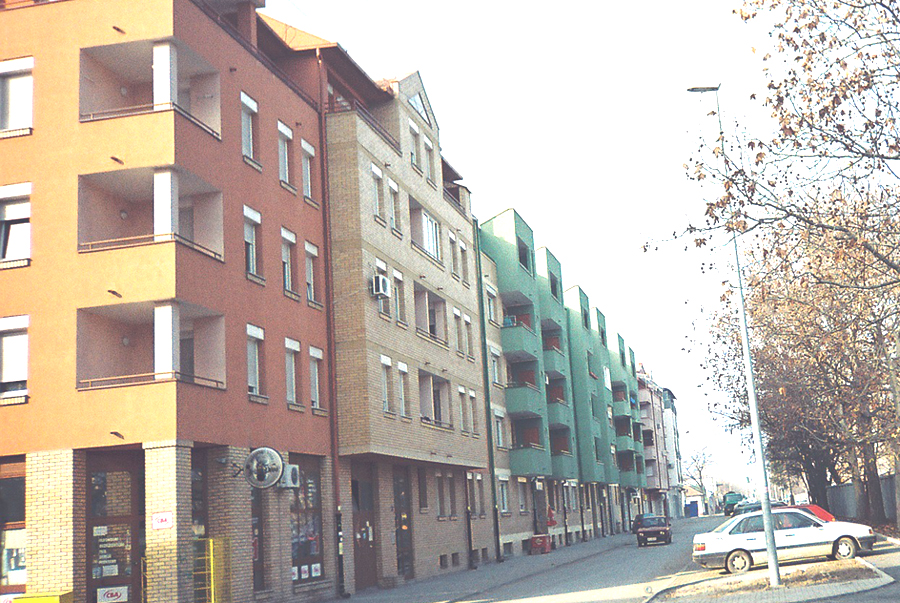
Detelinara, Trg Majke Jevrosime

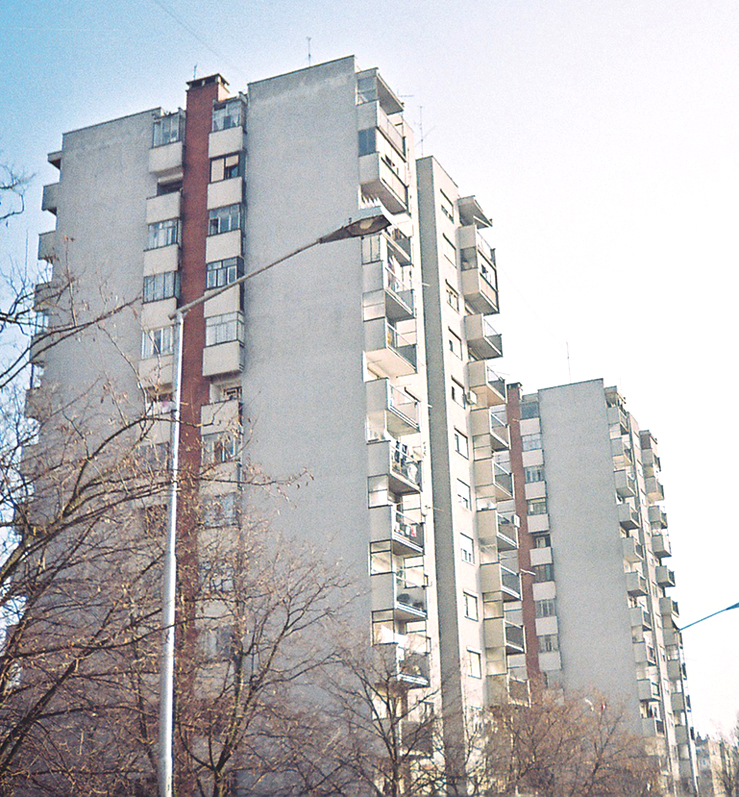
Detelinara, Veselina Masleše Street

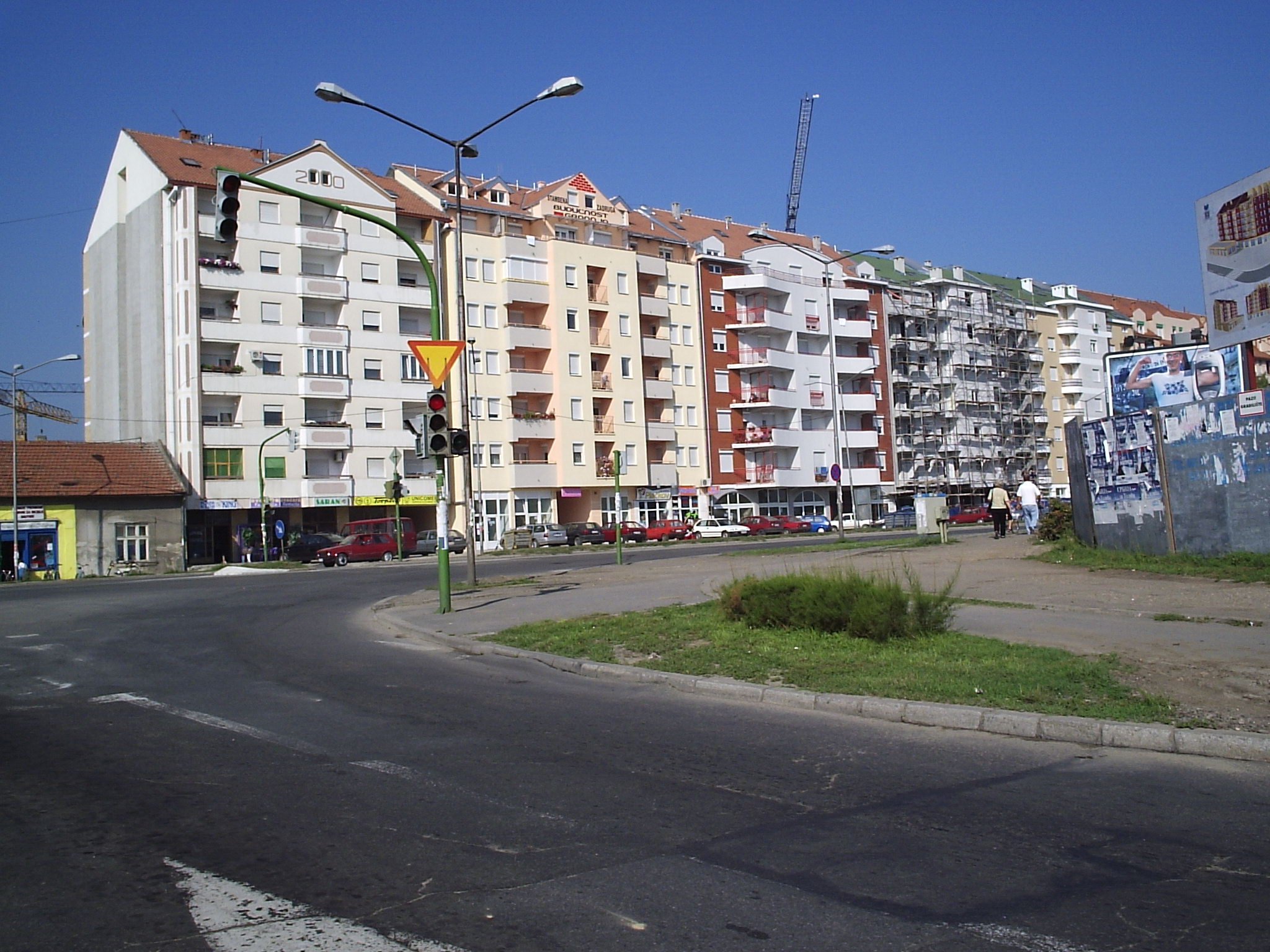
Detelinara, Rumenačka Street

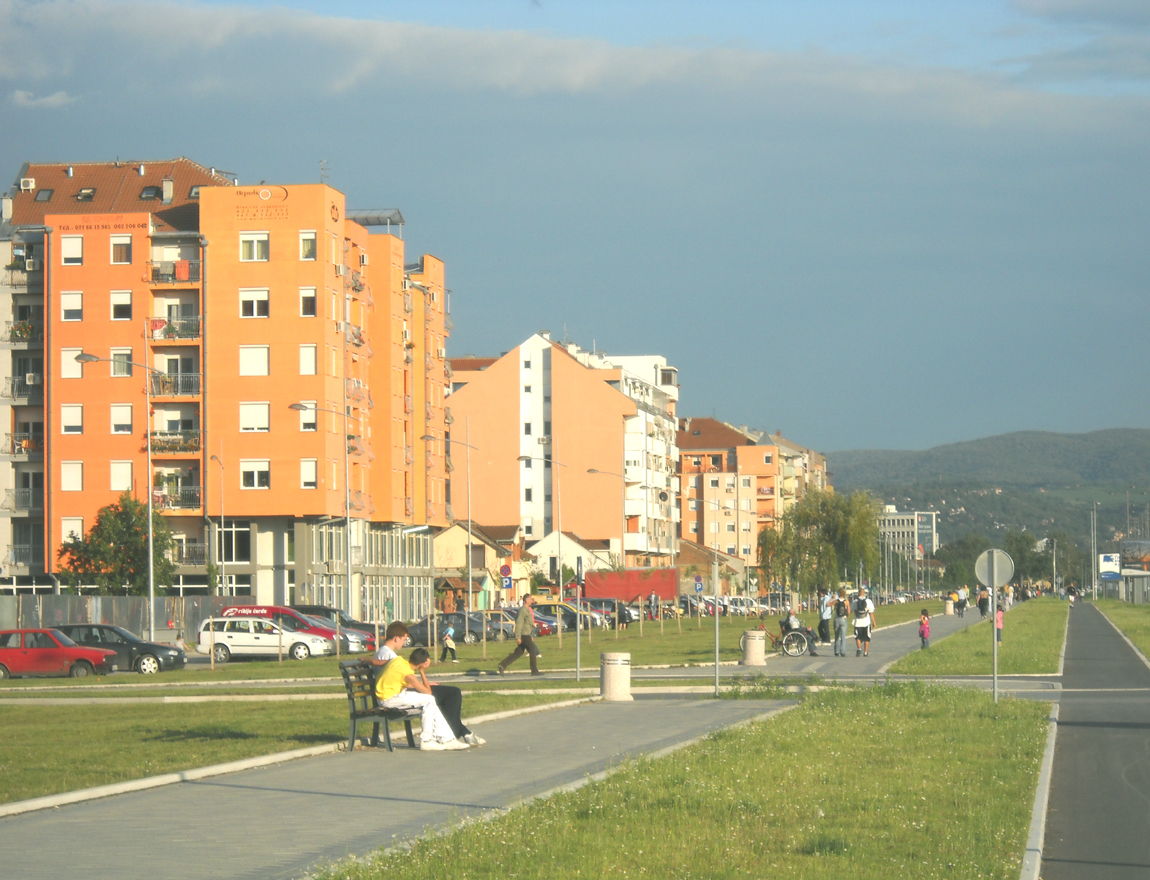
Detelinara, Subotica Boulevard (Boulevard of Europe)

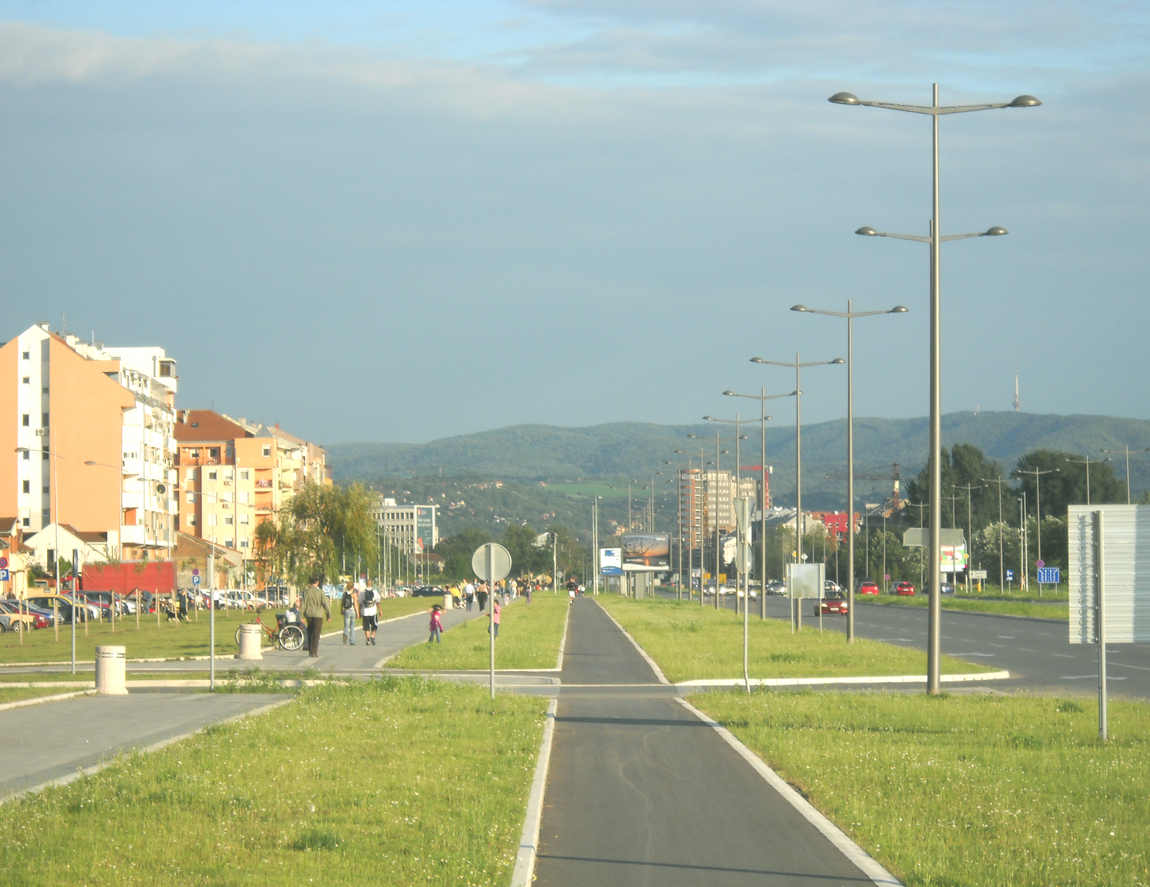
Detelinara, Subotica Boulevard (Boulevard of Europe)

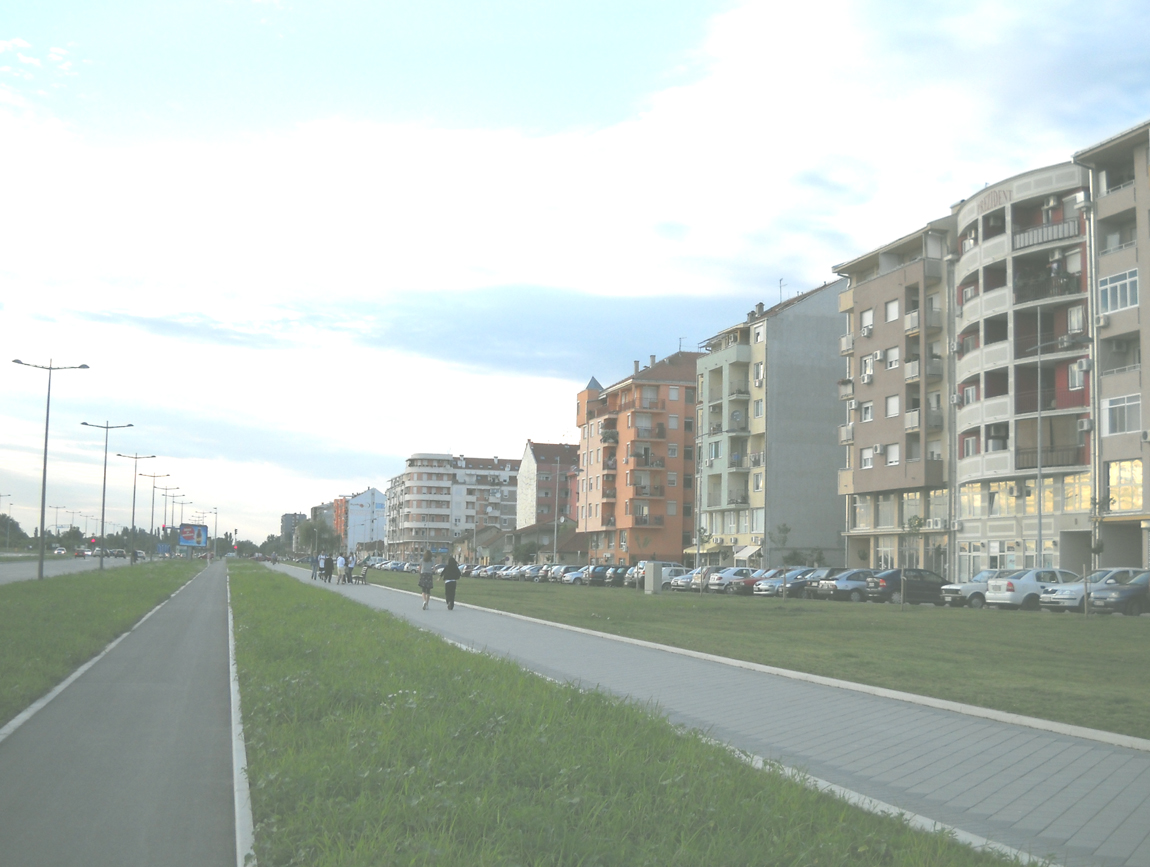
Detelinara, Subotica Boulevard (Boulevard of Europe)

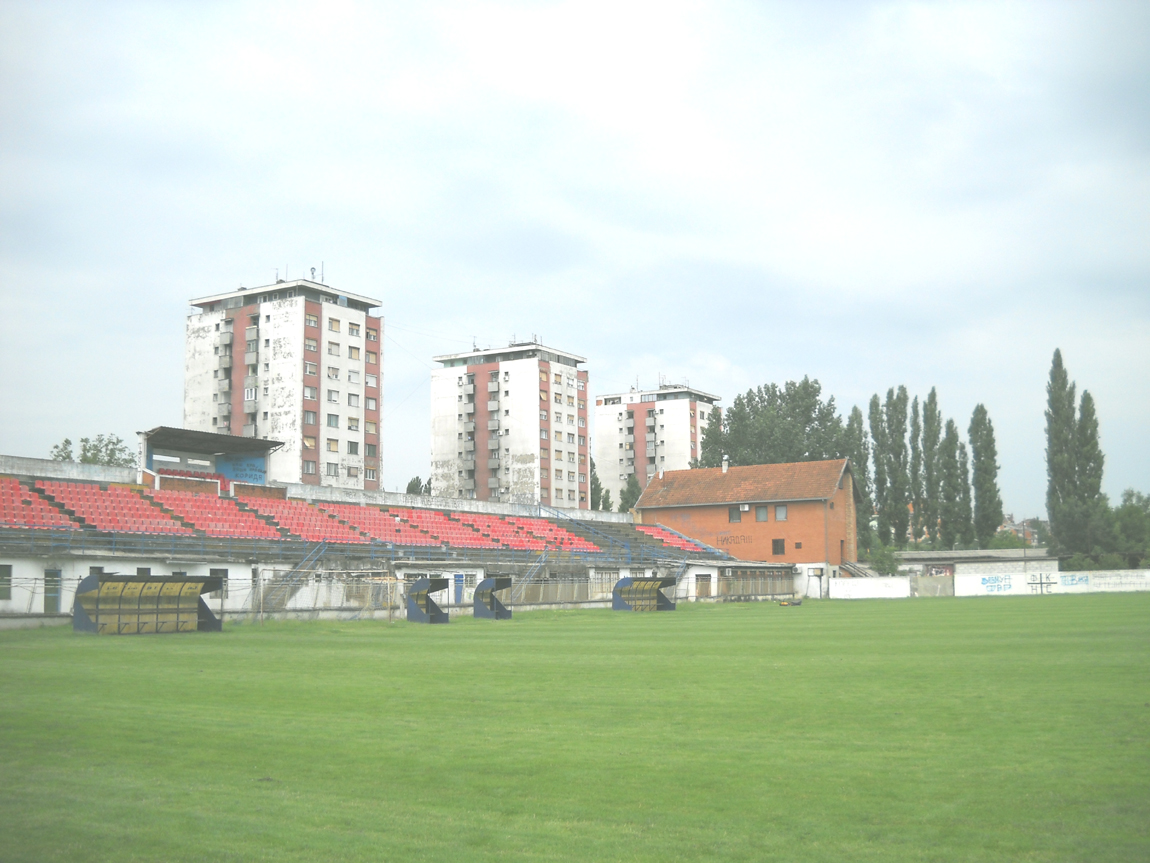
FK Novi Sad football stadium

== See also ==
- Neighborhoods of Novi Sad
