= Jugovićevo =

Jugovićevo Југовићево
- Urban neighborhood
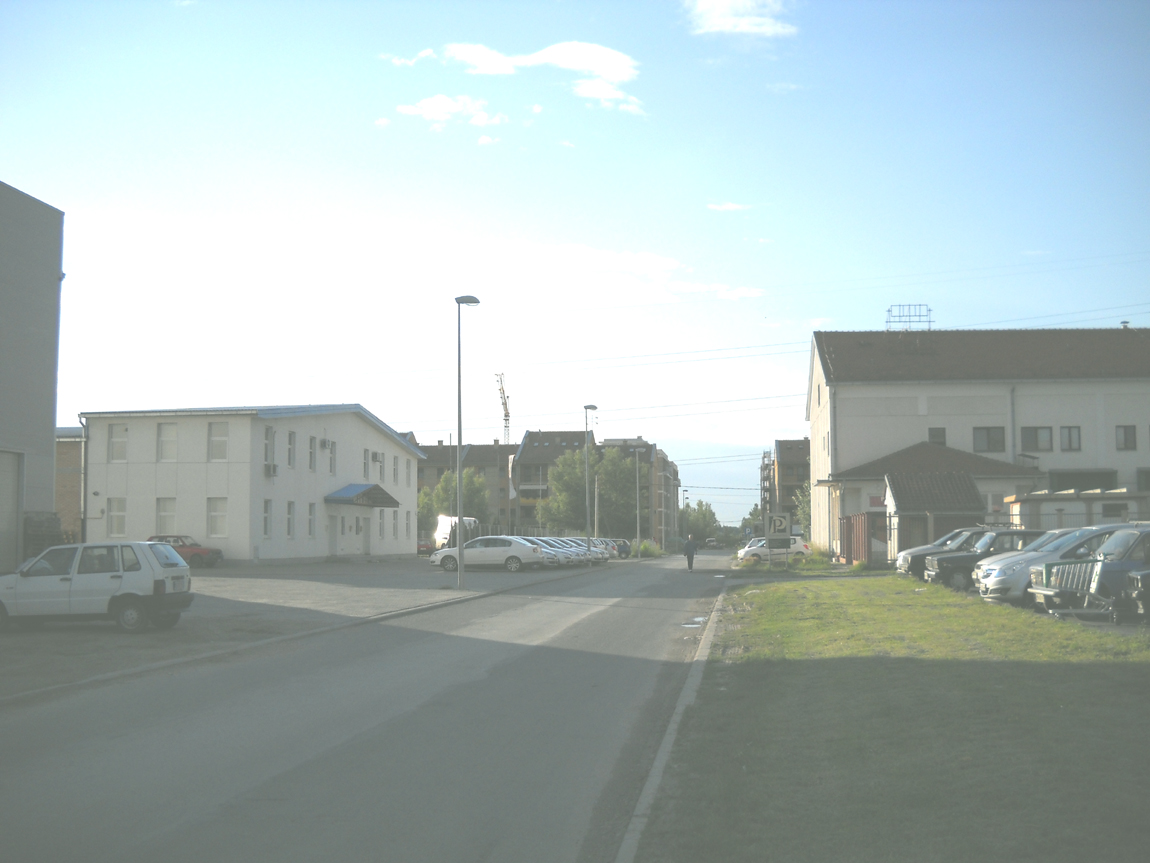
- Boško Petrovića Street at Jugovićevo

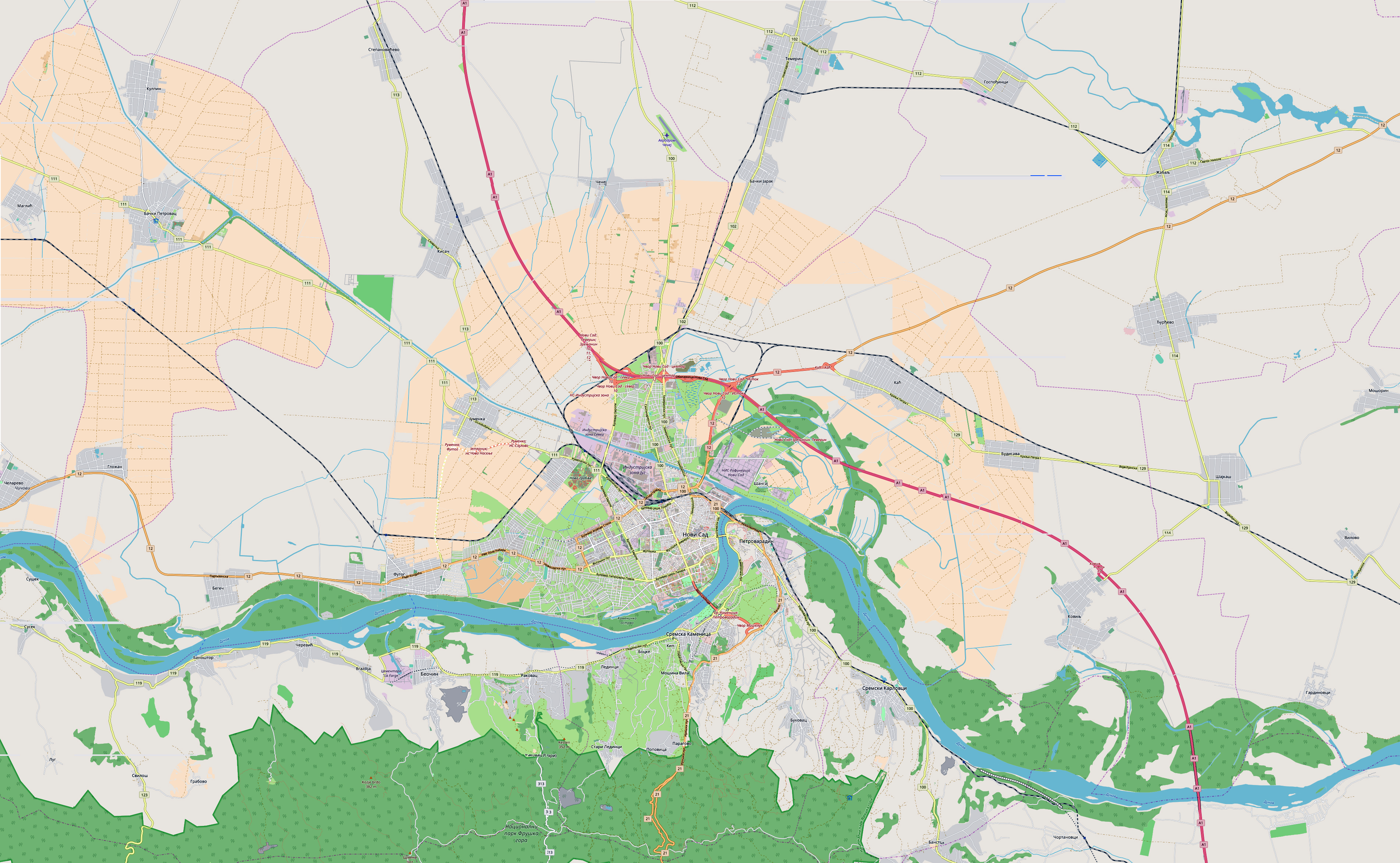
- Location within Novi Sad
- Coordinates: 45.26414167°N 19.79081389°E
- Country: Serbia
- Province: Vojvodina
- District: South Bačka
- Municipality: Novi Sad
- Time zone: UTC+1 (CET)
  - Summer (DST): UTC+2 (CEST)
- Area code: +381(0)21
- Car plates: NS

Jugovićevo (Serbian: Југовићево) is an urban neighborhood of the city of Novi Sad, Serbia. It is currently a developing neighborhood.

== Location ==
=== Borders ===
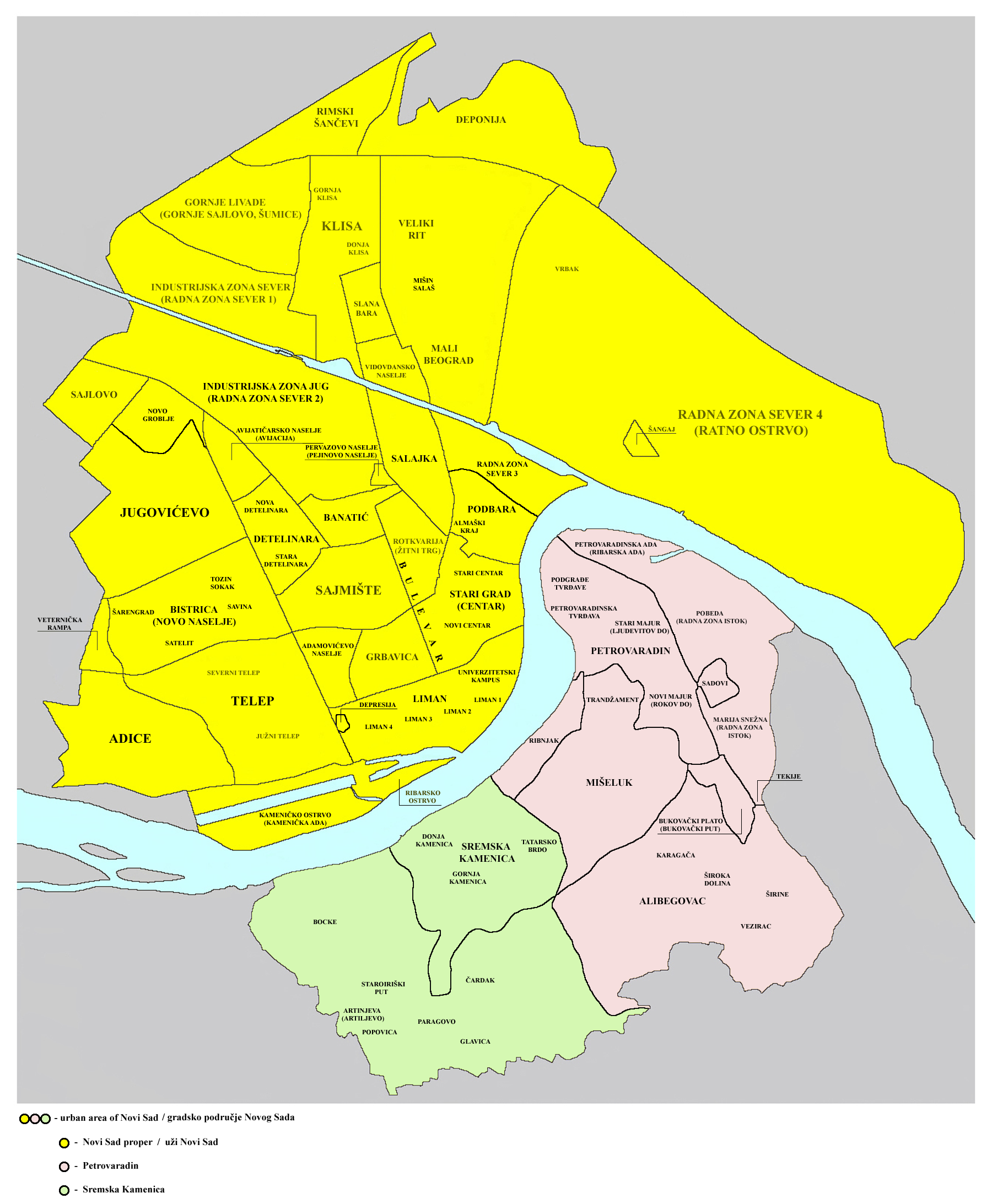
Map of the urban area of Novi Sad with city quarters, showing the location of Jugovićevo

The southern border of Jugovićevo is Vojvoda Stepa Boulevard, the eastern border is the Subotica Boulevard (Europe Boulevard), the north-eastern border is Rumenački put (Rumenka Road), the north-western border is Donje Sajlovo Street, and the western border is a western city limit of Novi Sad.

The neighboring settlements are: Veternička Rampa and Bistrica in the south, Detelinara and Avijatičarsko Naselje in the east, Industrijska Zona Jug in the north-east, and Sajlovo in the north-west.

== History ==
=== First Novi Sad airport ===
The neighborhood was named after the military airport Jugovićevo, which has been here since 1913. It was built for the needs of the Austro-Hungarian Air Force. Initially, the airport had only grassy runways for landing and taking off military aircraft, while the hangars were on neighboring Sajlovo. In 1916, airport facilities, barracks and technical workshops were built here. A Serbian squadron, when it landed on French planes in November 1918 after liberation found 11 wooden hangars here. Later, six brick hangars were erected, followed by headquarters, aeroplane workshops, officers' quarters, etc.

Later on the first pilot school was formed, with additional schools for reserve air officers, scouts, aircraft mechanics and other specialists. Since September 1920, a weather station has been operating here. Since 1924, the airport has celebrated the aviation Slava of Saint Elijah (August 2nd), and since 1926 the King's Cup competition has been held regularly on the birthday of Crown Prince Peter on September 6.

The airport was named "Jugovićevo" in 1928, after airforce commander Jovan Jugović. In early April 1941, German bombers bombed the airport. After the occupation of Bačka, the Germans built a 800-metre-long concrete runway and used the airport to fly and service planes intended for the Eastern Front. The Red Army and NOV ("Narodna Oslobodilačka Vojska", or the Socialist Yugoslav Army) have been holding planes there since October 1944, operating on the Srem front and later in the final operations to liberate Yugoslavia.

Since the mid-1950s, Jugovićevo lost its military significance. For a time there was a school for reserve officers (with a training ground), and today there is a military unit ("Majevica" barracks) stationed there. The military airport was moved to Batajnica for strategic reasons since 1951.

=== Constructions of the 1950s-1980s ===
For most of the 20th century, Jugovićevo was left undeveloped, with only large department stores and markets built across Vojvoda Stepa Boulevard for the newly made Novo Naselje neighborhood (later named Bistrica) and its residence (this would continue towards the 2020s). The electrical substation "Novi Sad 5" was built for Jugovićevo and the surrounding neighborhoods. The new city graveyard was constructed at the northern edges of the neighborhood in 1989 and continuously expanded its capacities since then.

=== Constructions of the 1990s-onward ===
During NATO bombing of Novi Sad in 1999, military complex Majevica and the electrical substation were heavily bombed and damaged, including several civilian buildings in the neighboring Old Detelinara and Avijatičarsko Naselje like the "Svetozar Marković Toza" elementary school.

Construction of first commercial buildings in this area started during the 1990s and was followed by construction of residential buildings. Up until the 2020s, several residential blocks were constructed (both low and high rise blocks). Several larger blocks and their apartments were constructed for the need to house the families of local officers and military personnel with beneficial prices.

By the General Urban Plan of Novi Sad for 2030, the remaining empty land areas in Jugovićevo and its surrounding neighborhoods are planned to be filled with new apartment blocks, public leisure and sports parks, schools, recreational centers, commercial and business buildings. Street extensions are planned for the neighborhood, properly connecting it to the surrounding neighborhoods through several junctions.

An eco-neighborhood is planned with a park-forest, despite the area having low tree cover and historically being a wetland with underground water issues.

==== School at Jugovićevo ====
In September 2023, plans for a new school in Jugovićevo were revealed. The school is planned to be made at the corner of Aleksandra Benjaka Street and Lenke Dunđerski Street. The Dositej Obradović elementary school announced the public procurement for the selection of contractors, while Mod Arhitekt from Novi Sad was charged for architectural project. Estimated cost of constructions is around one billion Serbian dinars. The school will take up an area of 14,852 square meters, with the building taking up 4,606 square meters. It will have an additional floor, with an accent on the central entrance hall, connecting education wing with the staff wing, mess hall, school library with a reading room, and physical education hall (with room up to 129 seats). The school is planned to accommodate up to 600 students, 20 classrooms.

At 23 November 2023, construction of the school began. The construction is spearheaded by Montop Pro firm of Marko Bosanac Bosketa, member of the Serbian Progressive Party. Other construction firms aiding in the construction are Sloga Construction firm from Kragujevac, Simbo gradnja from Veternik, Neo inženjering from Novi Sad and Montop Pro Technology, subsidiary of Montop Pro. At 8 December 2023, foundations for the school were planted during a ceremony by the Mayor of Novi Sad Milan Đurić, member of the City Assembly Dina Vučinić, and Montop Pro owner Marko Bosanac Bosketa. The school is planned to be completed by 2025.

== Population ==
Due to Jugovićevo being a new neighborhood, it does not have its own separate local community, as such its residence count is compiled with residence from Old Detelinara, Avijatičarsko Naselje, and Bistrica neighborhoods.

Since 2022, "Jugovićevo" local community has around 11,600 registered residence.

== Local Communities ==
Jugovićevo is part of Novi Sad municipality and is divided into two local communities:

- "Jugovićevo", Shevchenko's Terrace 1, based in Detelinara (includes Jugovićevo, Old Detelinara, and parts of Avijatičarsko Naselje;
- "Bistrica", located in Braće Dronjak 11, encompasses northwestern parts of Bistrica neighborhood and southeastern parts of Jugovićevo towards Vojvoda Stepa Boulevard.

== Culture ==
In September, an "Open Day" or "Open Door Day" event is held at the Majevica barraks. The aim of this event is to show the citizens of Novi Sad the daily life and activities of the Serbian army units stationed there, along with a display of the unit's armaments and military equipment.

=== Cuisine ===
The neighborhood has privately owned, restaurants, cafes, and banquet halls showcasing typical Serbian and international food and drinks.

== Economy ==
Jugovićevo, just as many neighborhoods in Novi Sad, has commercial areas integrated with residential areas such as: business centers, trade and craft shops, supermarkets, etc. Most Jugovićevo residence also use the commercial areas at the very edge of Bistrica and Detelinara neighborhoods.

Some of the economic and financial areas in Jugovićevo are: "Vatrogas" Institute, "HET BARD" (corporate office), "IMPULS HEMIJA" (chemical manufacturer), "Limnos" (textile mill), etc.

=== Transportation ===
Historically, the Novi Sad railway passed at the eastern edges of the neighborhood. With the dismantling of the southern city railway connections (moving the railway station from Liman to Boulevard of Jaše Tomića), most of the railway infrastructure was gradually dismantled over the following decades. The last cargo railways passed in 2021, when the majority of the railway rails were dismantled due to the construction of the new park in Bistrica neighborhood and the accompanying residential block.

Bus lines 6, 7, 8, and 13 connect this neighborhood with other major city neighborhoods, as well as some surrounding settlements. However, there are currently no bus lines that go within the neighborhood itself (only at the outlines).

Most Jugovićevo residence travel via car or taxi due to the lack of convenient public transportation network and lack of cycling infrastructure in the neighborhood.

Jugovićevo, transportation and communication wise, is currently only connected to its neighboring areas (primarily Bistrica neighborhood) through four streets (three connecting only to the side street of Vojvode Stepe Boulevard, while one directly connecting to the boulevard itself). Plans are for the neighborhood to expand its road network towards its eastern and western parts, connecting the residential blocks to Subotica Boulevard (Europe Boulevard) and Bate Brkića Boulevard.

Notable Jugovićevo streets are: Draška Ređepa Street, Olge Hadžić Street, Lenke Duđerski Street, Aleksandra Benjaka Street, Boška Petrovića Street, Pavla Ivića Street, Milutina Milankovića Street, Vojvoda Stepa Boulevard, Subotica Boulevard (Europe Boulevard), and Rumenka Road.

== Society ==
=== Education ===
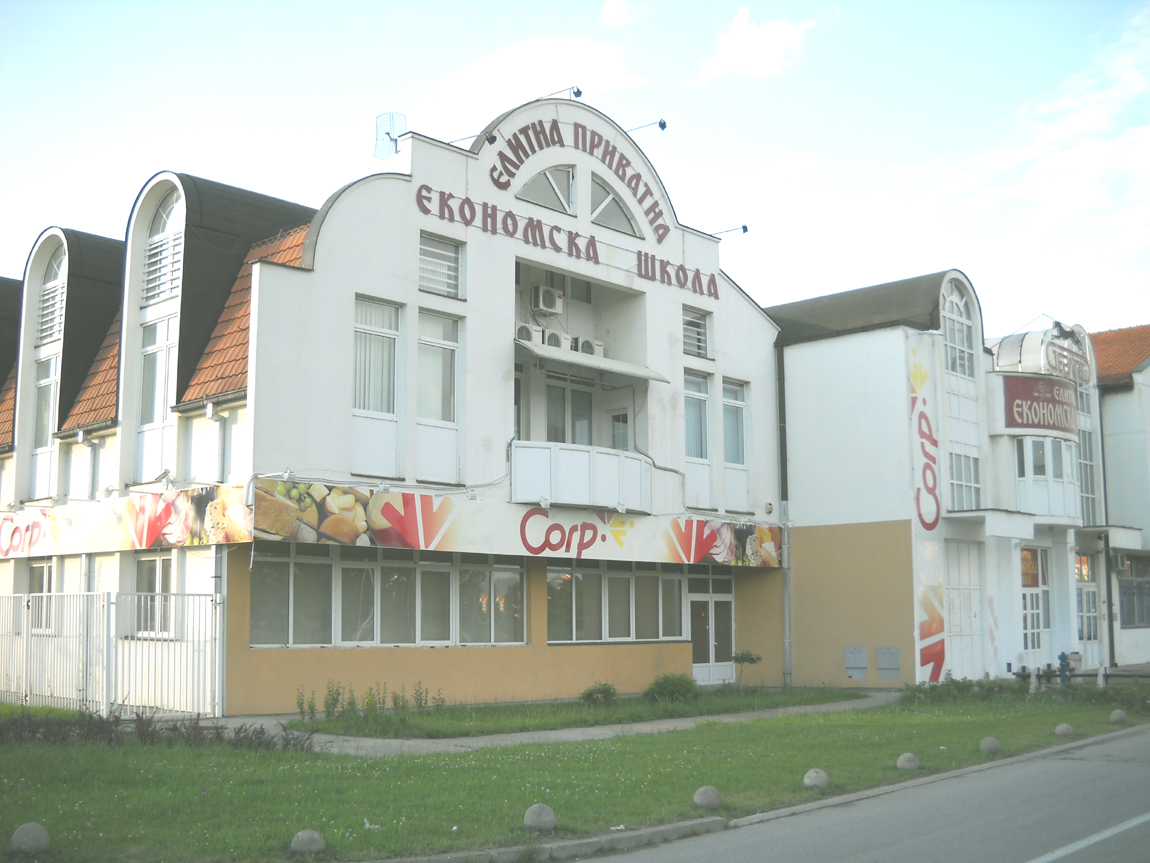
Elite private economical school in Jugovićevo

For a short time, a private economic school ("Elitna privatna ekonomska škola" was located at Jugovićevo. Currently there are plans for building a kindergarten in the neighborhood, with an elementary school under construction.

=== Recreation ===
Currently, Jugovićevo has no recreational areas (apart from "Starli" amusement park) for its residence, with only a few small public green spaces between the large residential blocks.

A sports center is planned in the neighborhood, with a sports hall and athletic track with spectator area. Plans for the design of the center were made public in 2021. Construction was to start in Spring of 2022, However, due to the rise of prices for construction material, there are currently no funds and eagerness from the city government to construct such an area. Construction of the center is currently on hold.

== Gallery ==
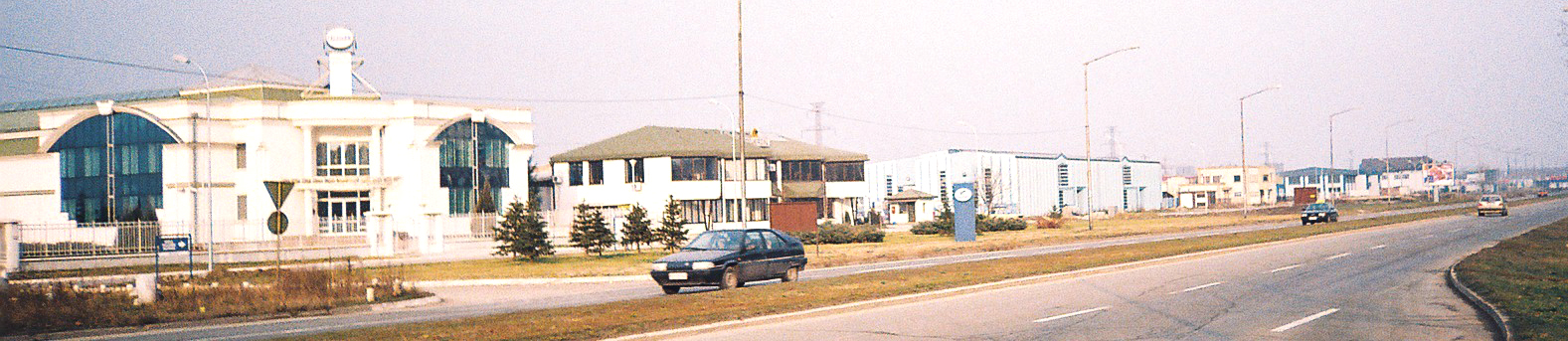
Jugovićevo, Vojvoda Stepa Boulevard

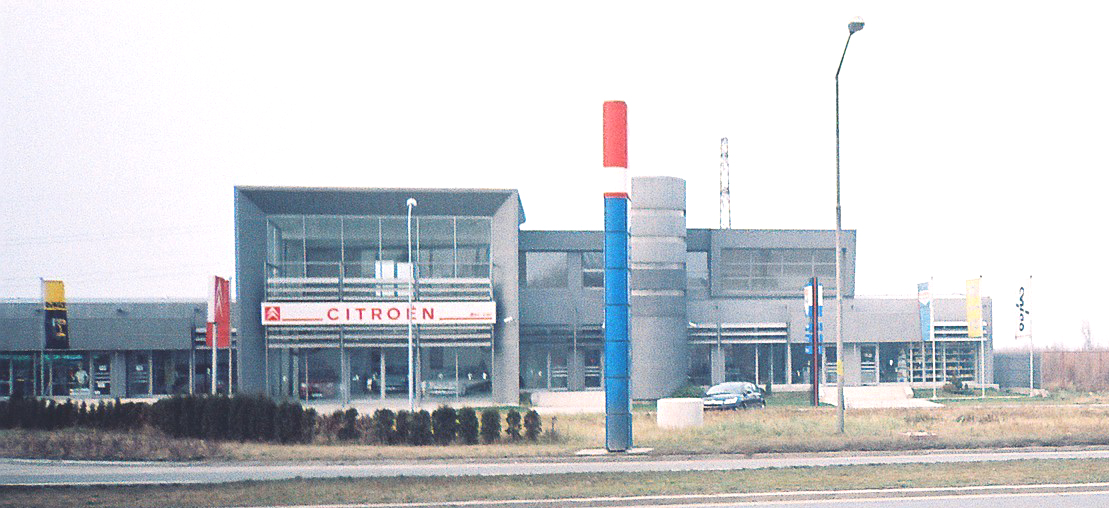
Jugovićevo, Vojvoda Stepa Boulevard

== See also ==
- Neighborhoods of Novi Sad
- Bistrica
- Detelinara
- Avijatičarsko Naselje
- Sajlovo
