= NATO bombing of Novi Sad =

Part of the NATO bombing of Yugoslavia

- Part of the NATO bombing of Yugoslavia of the Kosovo War
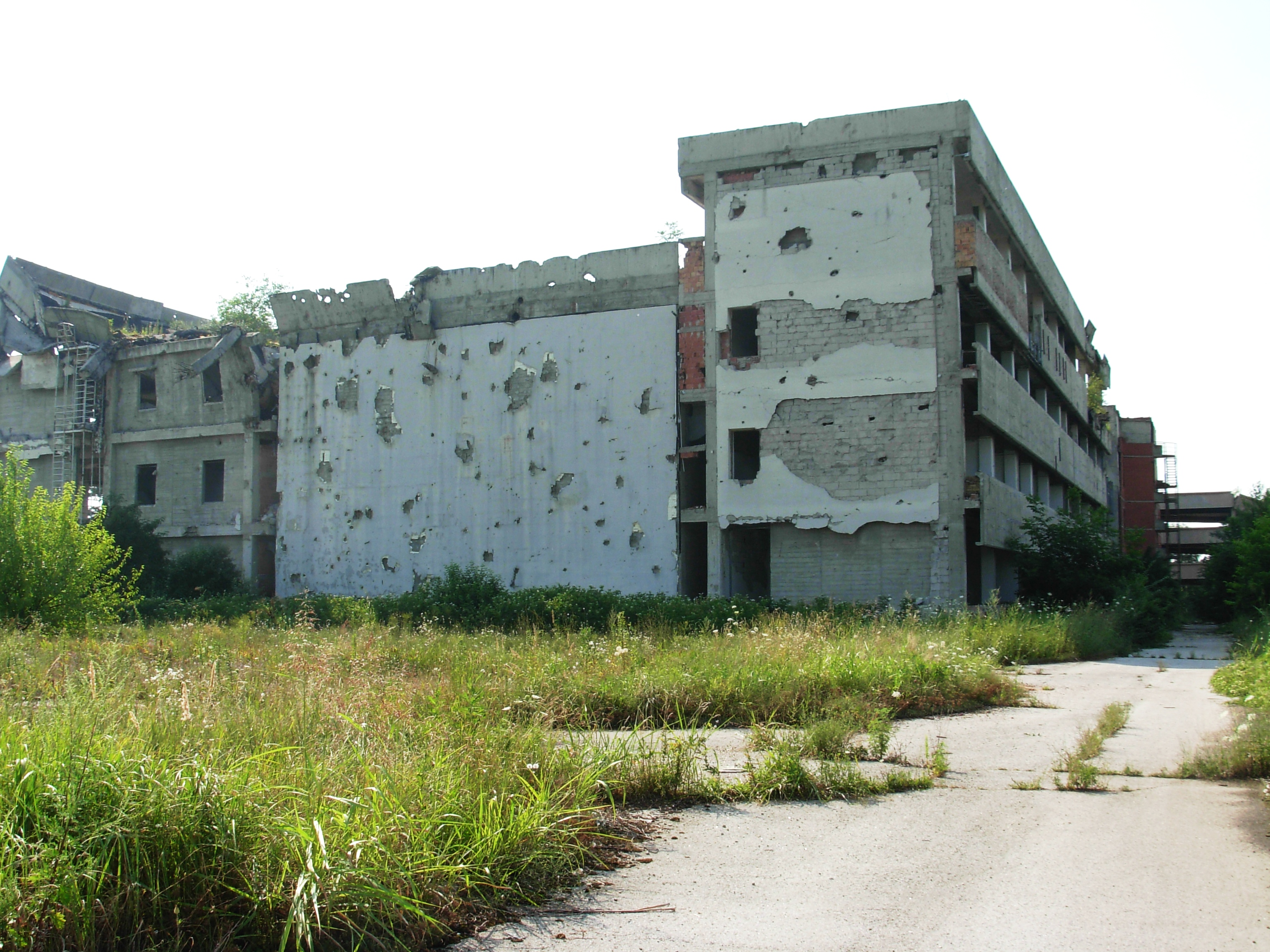
- Razed TVNS building in Mišeluk
- Location: 45°15′15″N 19°50′33″E; Novi Sad, Federal Republic of Yugoslavia
- Date: 24 March – 9 June 1999
- Target: Novi Sad
- Attack type: Aerial bombing
- Deaths: ~2
- Injuries: ~17
- Perpetrator: NATO

During the 1999 NATO bombing of Yugoslavia, aerial bombings were carried out against the second largest Yugoslav city of Novi Sad. According to NATO press releases, the bombing targeted oil refineries, roads, bridges, and telecommunications relay stations, facilities which had military uses. The bombing of the city caused great damage to local civilians, including severe pollution and widespread ecological damage as well as lasting consequences for the well-being of the population.

== Chronology of the bombing ==
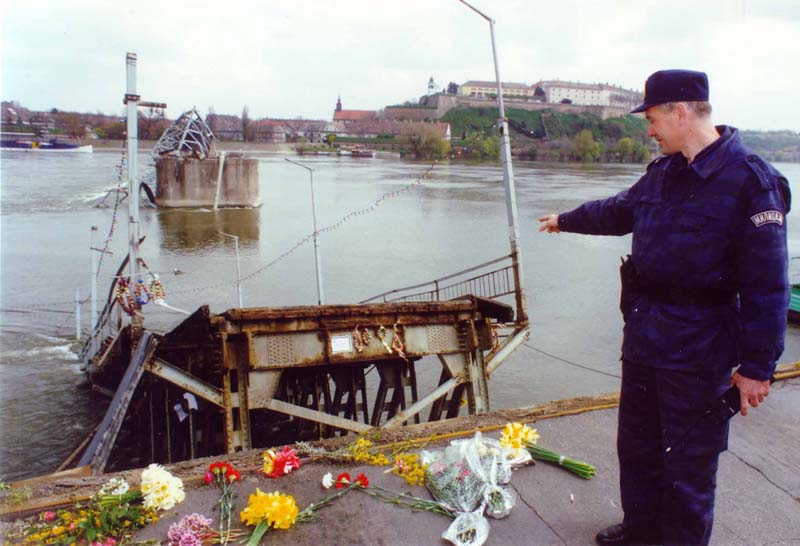
Varadin Bridge destroyed.

- March 24: NATO bombed a storehouse of the police center in the industrial zone, as well as the "Motins" factory.
- April 1: Varadin Bridge on the Danube was destroyed by NATO bombs.
- April 3: Liberty Bridge on the Danube was destroyed by NATO bombs. Seven civilians were injured. After the bridge was destroyed, the institute for cardio-vascular diseases in Sremska Kamenica lost its water supply.
- April 5: NATO bombed the oil refinery in the industrial zone, as well as Žeželj Bridge on the Danube, which was damaged.
- April 7: NATO bombed the oil refinery as well as the residential civilian quarter Vidovdansko Naselje where four civilians were injured and several houses damaged.
- April 11: NATO bombed the military object "Majevica" in Jugovićevo.
- April 13: NATO bombed the oil refinery.
- April 15: NATO bombed the oil refinery and the military object "Majevica" in Jugovićevo.
- April 18: NATO bombed the oil refinery which triggered a large fire and much smoke, which caused serious ecological damage. The building of the Government of the Autonomous Province of Vojvodina in the city centre was also hit by NATO bombs.
- April 21: NATO bombed the oil refinery and Žeželj Bridge, as well as the Beška Bridge on the Danube.

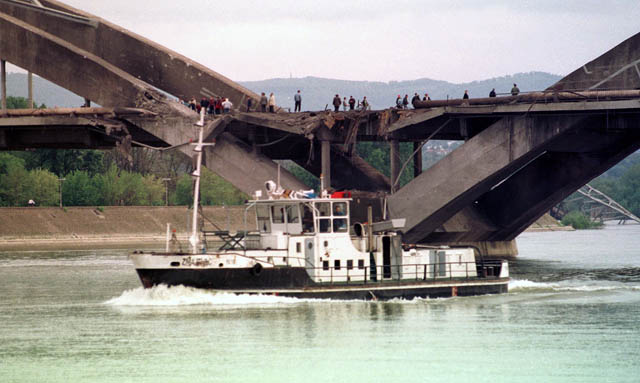
Žeželj Bridge damaged in first attack.

- April 22: NATO bombed Žeželj Bridge on the Danube.
- April 23: NATO bombed a TV transmitter in the wider area of Novi Sad.
- April 24: NATO bombed the oil refinery causing fire and smoke. Fruška Gora was also bombed.
- April 26: NATO finally managed to destroy Žeželj Bridge, the last bridge on the Danube that the city had.

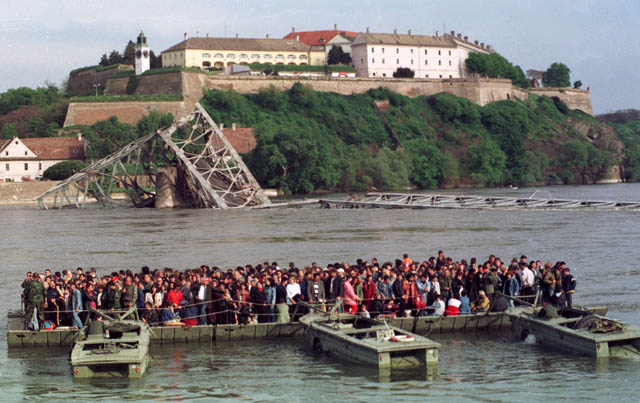
With all bridges destroyed, Novi Sad residents were forced to cross the Danube via an army pontoon ferry.

- April 27: NATO bombed the oil refinery and Fruška Gora.
- April 29: NATO bombed the oil refinery and Fruška Gora.
- May 1: NATO bombed the oil refinery causing large amounts of smoke that covered the city for several days. Fruška Gora was also bombed.
- May 2: NATO bombed the northern suburbs of Novi Sad causing the city to lose its water supply and electricity.
- May 3: NATO bombed the buildings of Novi Sad Television in Mišeluk as well as the northern suburbs of the city.
- May 6: NATO bombed the military object "Majevica" in Jugovićevo as well as the civilian residential quarter Detelinara damaging residential buildings.
- May 7: NATO bombed Iriški Venac and Brankovac on Fruška Gora.
- May 8: NATO bombed the military object "Majevica" in Jugovićevo and Fruška Gora.
- May 13: NATO bombed the buildings of the Novi Sad Television in Mišeluk. Its buildings were heavily damaged as well as neighbouring civilian residential houses. Fruška Gora was also bombed, as well as electric installations in Rimski Šančevi causing the city to lose electricity again.
- May 15: NATO bombed Brankovac on Fruška Gora.
- May 18: NATO bombed Fruška Gora.
- May 20: NATO bombed Fruška Gora.
- May 22: NATO bombed Fruška Gora including a TV tower on Iriški Venac.
- May 23: NATO bombed Fruška Gora and electric installations in Rimski Šančevi.
- May 24: NATO bombed the oil refinery causing smoke that again covered part of the city. Fruška Gora was also bombed.
- May 26: NATO bombed buildings of the Novi Sad Television in Mišeluk, as well as Dunavski Kej (Danube Quay) near the city centre. Paragovo, Iriški Venac on Fruška Gora and a small barrack in Bukovac were also bombed.
- May 29: NATO bombed buildings of the Novi Sad Television as well as the civilian residential quarter Ribnjak where two civilians were badly injured.
- May 30: NATO bombed the civilian residential area in Sremska Kamenica where one child was badly injured and two civilian houses were destroyed. The civilian residential area Ribnjak was also bombed as well as buildings of the Novi Sad Television, a tunnel near the previously destroyed Liberty Bridge, a road near the entrance to Sremska Kamenica, part of Fruška Gora between Paragovo and Krušedol, and the northern vicinity of Novi Sad.
- May 31: NATO bombed electric installations in Rimski Šančevi causing the city to lose its water supply and electricity. Fruška Gora was also bombed.
- June 1: NATO bombed suburban settlements Čenej and Pejićevi Salaši, as well as Fruška Gora.
- June 2: NATO bombed Fruška Gora.
- June 4: NATO bombed Brankovac and Čot on Fruška Gora.
- June 8 and 9: NATO bombed the oil refinery. One civilian was killed, while two civilians and one child were badly injured. The civilian residential quarter Šangaj was also bombed where one civilian was killed and several more civilians were injured, while several civilian houses were destroyed. Although these were the bloodiest days of the bombing, they were also the last.

== Consequences ==
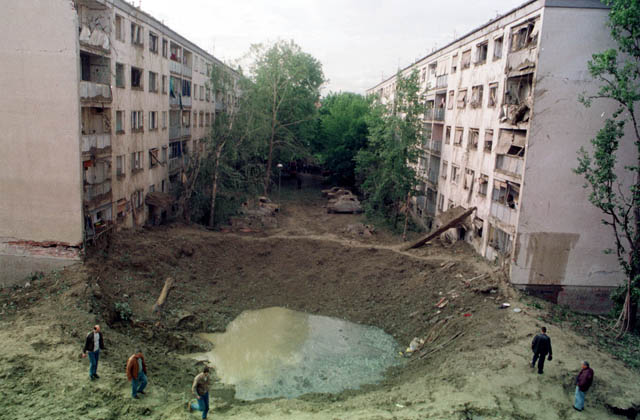
NATO missile crater in the area between two apartment buildings and the elementary school "Svetozar Marković Toza".

=== Impact on civilians ===
The bombing caused civilian deaths and injuries. Those who were not directly physically harmed suffer from consequences for their physical health caused by ecological damage as well as consequences for psychological health caused by almost three months of trauma and fear. Due to the NATO attacks, many in Novi Sad were left unemployed.

Notably, Amnesty International accused NATO of failing to give "effective advance warning" of attacks which may affect civilians, as required by Protocol I. One such attack where NATO was accused of this was the bombing of the Ministry of Education in Novi Sad, premises which administered social welfare programmes.

==== Impact on infrastructure ====
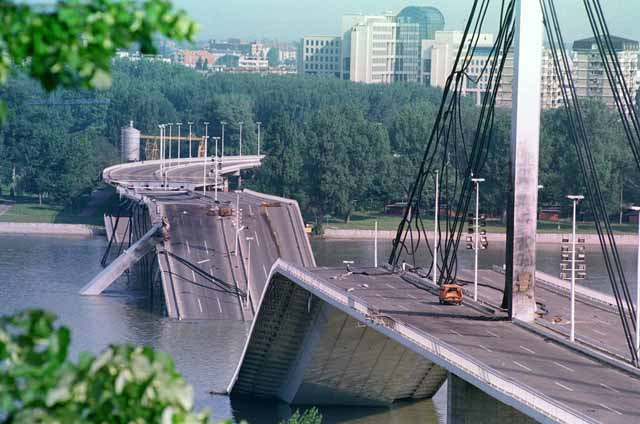
Liberty Bridge destroyed in NATO air strike.

The NATO bombing left Novi Sad without any of its three Danube bridges, communications, water, and electricity, which severely impaired the day to day living of the residents of the city. Water services were restored only after two years, partially due to funding from Britain, one of the countries which bombed the city in 1999. All three bridges have been rebuilt as of 2018 with the completion of Žeželj Bridge.

==== Impact on environment ====
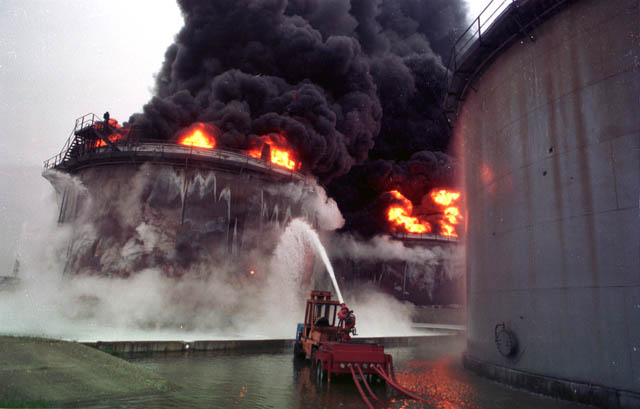
Refinery hit by NATO missile.

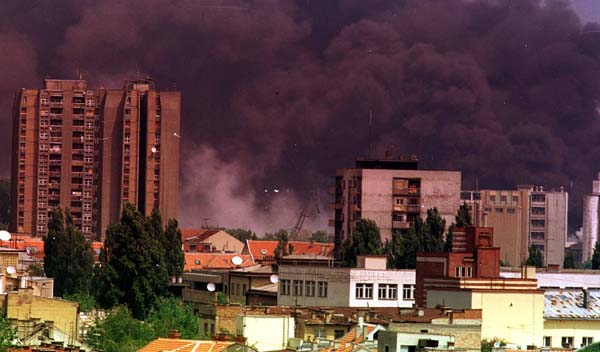
Smoke from bombed Novi Sad's refinery.

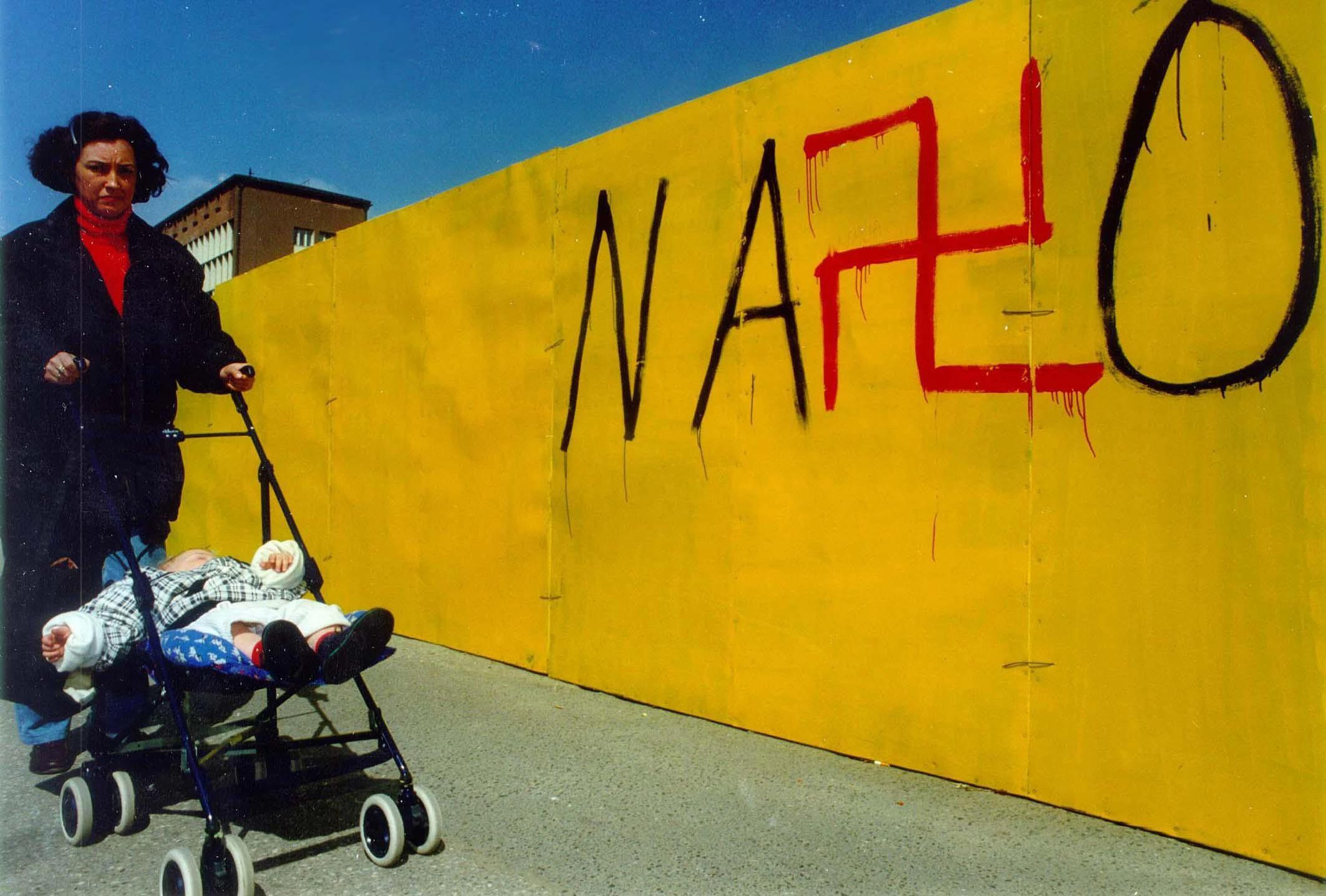
Anti-NATO graffiti on a wall during the bombing of Novi Sad

The bombing of Novi Sad had implications for the environment. A United Nations study (the BTF ‘Industrial Sites’ and ‘Danube’ missions) found that there were serious environmental issues, "requiring immediate action", some of which resulted from the bombing. The bombing of Novi Sad's refinery caused fires which burned 50,000 tons of crude oil, sending toxins and carcinogens into the air and contaminating groundwater. The BTF study was complicated by the heavy pollution that existed before the bombing, with the group noting that "the enforced shutdown of the refinery may even have led to local improvements in the aquatic environment, due to a possible reduction in chronic pollution".

Once all the samples for Novi Sad (Danube Mission) were collated, "based on field observation and results from sample analysis, the BTF concluded that there was no evidence of significant adverse impacts on the Danube aquatic environment as a result of air strikes on Novi Sad refinery. It is thought that most of the oils and oil products released were burned and that no significant volume entered the river".

The BTF study also found that prior to the air strikes, local technicians helped minimise the potential harmful effects of air strikes by "removing oil products that could be harmful to human health if spilt or burnt, such as transformer oil containing PCBs. Production was also accelerated to use up as much as possible of the crude oil, intermediate products and additives, and the final products were shipped to other locations. The remaining oil was mixed with gasoline, so that the tanks would ignite if hit, rather than leak into the soil and groundwater".

By 2003, the Danube Commission had removed all of the debris of bombed bridges and ordnance from the river. The clearing of the debris was important not only for Novi Sad, but for European states (such as Hungary and Romania) who were economically impacted by the blockade of river traffic to the Black Sea caused by the bombing.

== Views of the respective parties ==
NATO was accused of committing war crimes due to the nature of some of the bombing raids. Some Novi Sad residents found it ironic that Novi Sad was so heavily targeted by NATO due to the fact that during the time of the bombing, the city was ruled by the local democratic opposition, which was against the regime in Belgrade. Therefore, some citizens of Novi Sad did not understand why the city was targeted for the events in Kosovo.

At a press release one year on from the bombing, then-NATO Secretary General George Robertson claimed that NATO encountered complications due to the Yugoslav military using civilian buildings, and the civilians within as human shields. NATO officials expressed "deep regret at any civilian casualties it caused".

NATO claimed that the bombing of targets such as bridges was aimed at impairing the Yugoslav Army's command and control structure. However, the efficacy of the campaign and choice of targets was brought into question by human rights groups, after bridges of no conceivable strategic relevance to the war in Kosovo were bombed, including a bridge which led to Hungary, a NATO country. In response to NATO's justification of actions, the Movement for the Advancement of International Criminal Law (MAICL) argued that the civilian deaths caused were clearly disproportionate to the military benefits.

== See also ==
- Kosovo War – 1998–1999 armed conflict in the Balkans
- International criminal law
- International Criminal Court
  - International Criminal Tribunal for the former Yugoslavia
