= Industrial zones in Novi Sad =

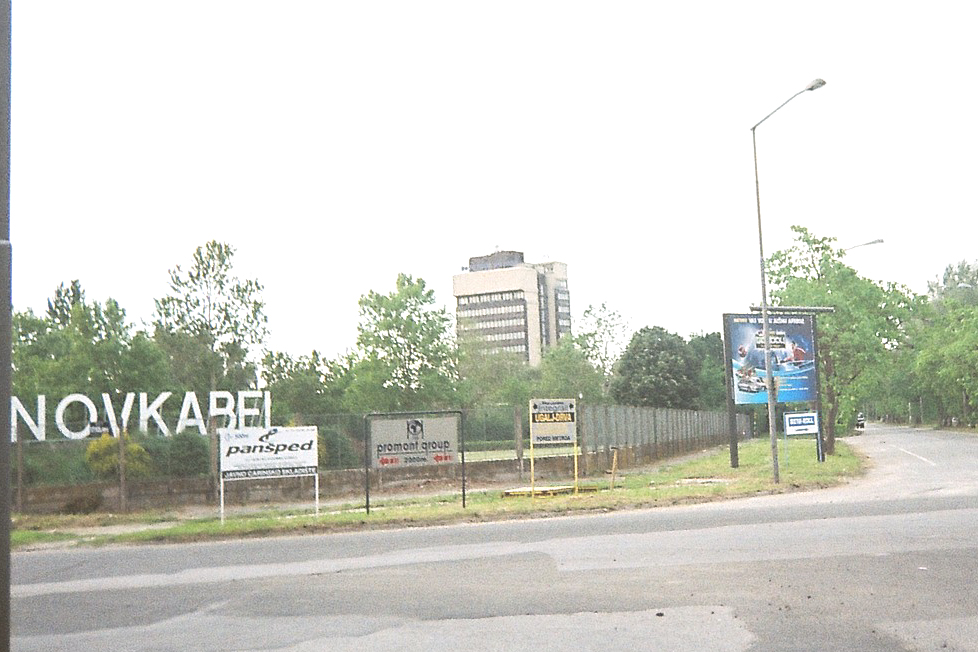
Industrijska Zona Jug (Southern industrial zone) in Novi Sad

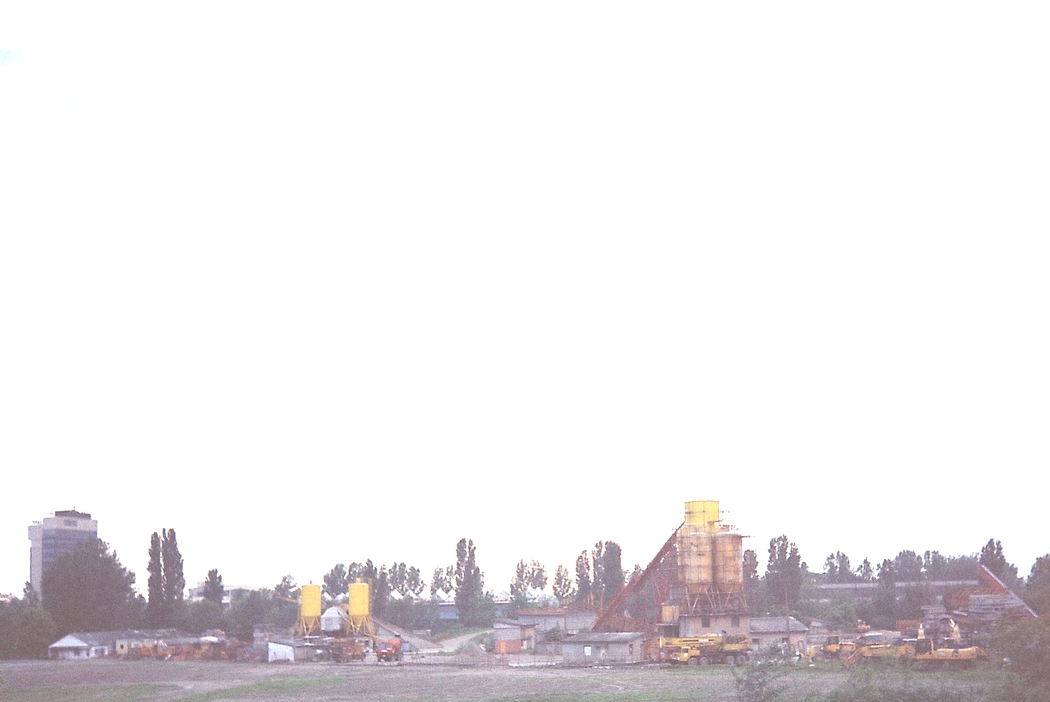
Industrijska Zona Jug (Southern industrial zone) in Novi Sad

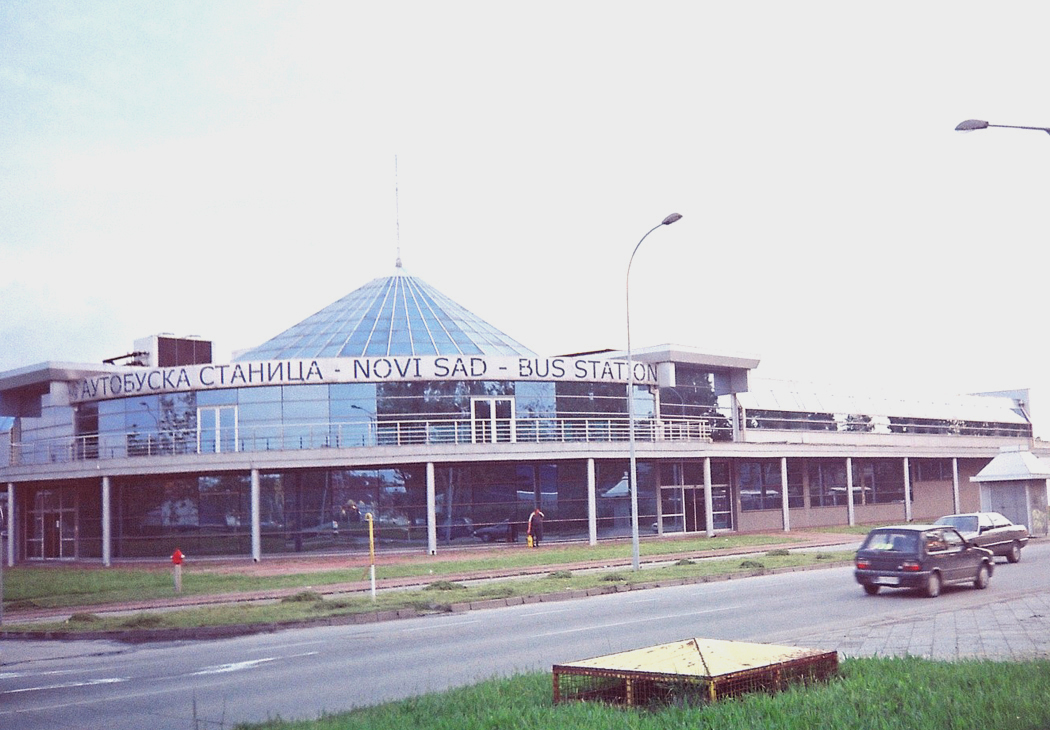
Bus station of "ATP Vojvodina" company in Industrijska Zona Jug (Southern industrial zone) in Novi Sad

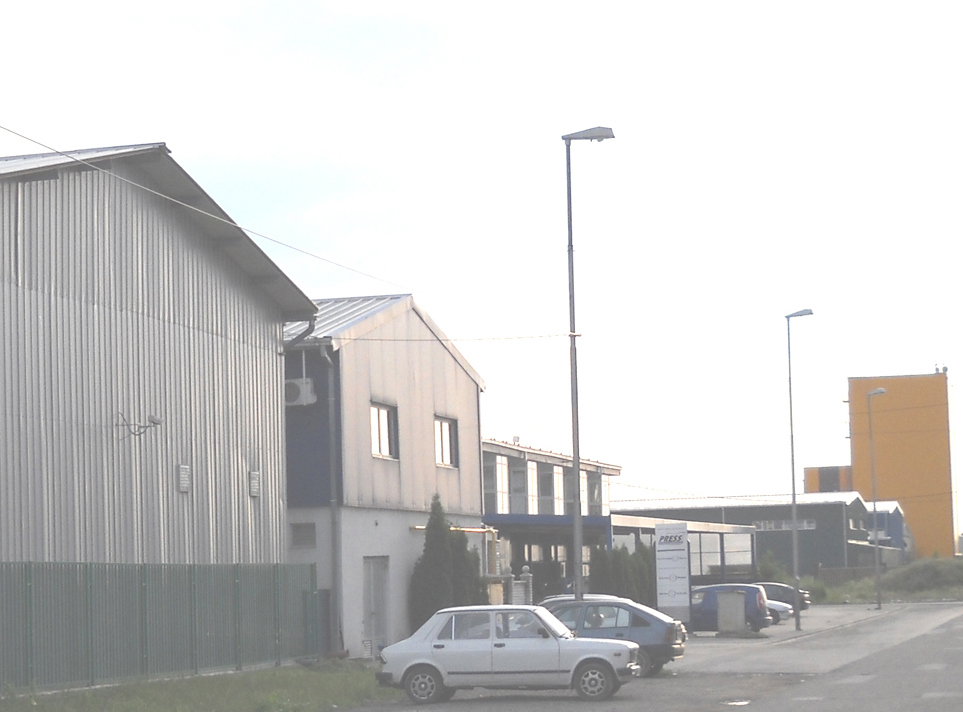
Industrijska Zona Sever (Northern industrial zone) in Novi Sad

The City of Novi Sad Serbia has several industrial zones, which are, unlike non-industrial neighborhoods, mostly used for industrial purposes.

== List of industrial zones in Novi Sad ==
1. Marija Snežna (Radna Zona Istok)
2. Rasadnik (Radna Zona Zapad)
3. Radna Zona Sever I (Industrijska Zona Sever)
4. Radna Zona Sever II (Industrijska Zona Jug)
5. Radna Zona Sever III
6. Radna Zona Sever IV
7. Rimski Šančevi
8. Zapadna Privredna Zona (Radna Zona Zapad)
9. Pobeda (Radna Zona Istok)
10. Deponija

== Marija Snežna ==
Marija Snežna is a name for one part of Radna Zona Istok (Work Zone East) in Petrovaradin, located in the south-east of Sadovi neighborhood.

== Rasadnik ==
Rasadnik is a name for one part of Radna Zona Zapad (Work Zone West) in Novo Naselje, located in the western part of this neighborhood. Main company located in this industrial zone is "Javno Gradsko Saobraćajno Preduzeće" (a city public transportation company).

== Radna Zona Sever I ==
Radna Zona Sever I (Work Zone North I), also known as Industrijska Zona Sever (Industrial Zone North), is located on the northern bank of Danube-Tisa-Danube Channel near neighborhoods of Klisa and Gornje Livade.

== Radna Zona Sever II ==
Radna Zona Sever II (Work Zone North II), also known as Industrijska Zona Jug (Industrial Zone South), is located on the southern bank of Danube-Tisa-Danube Channel near neighborhoods of Salajka, Pervazovo Naselje, Banatić, Detelinara, Avijatičarsko Naselje, Jugovićevo, and Sajlovo.

== Radna Zona Sever III ==
Radna Zona Sever III (Work Zone North III) is located in the northern part of Podbara neighborhood, on the southern bank of Danube-Tisa-Danube Channel.

== Radna Zona Sever IV ==
Radna Zona Sever IV (Work Zone North IV) is the largest industrial zone in the city. It is located in north-eastern part of Novi Sad near neighborhoods of Šangaj, Mali Beograd, Mišin Salaš and Veliki Rit. City oil refinery is located in this industrial zone. Refinery was heavily devastated by NATO bombs during NATO bombing of Novi Sad in 1999.

== Rimski Šančevi ==
Industrial zone Rimski Šančevi is located in the northern part of the city near neighborhoods of Klisa and Gornje Livade.

== Zapadna Privredna Zona ==
Zapadna Privredna Zona (West Economic Zone) or Radna Zona Zapad (Work Zone West) is located in eastern part of Novo Naselje neighborhood. There are several factories located in this industrial zone: "Jugoalat" (a factory for production of cutting tools), "Jugodent" (a factory for production of dentist equipment), "Dunav" (a factory for production of orthopedic equipment), etc.

== Pobeda ==
Pobeda is a name for one part of Radna Zona Istok (Work Zone East) in Petrovaradin.

== Deponija ==
Deponija (garbage dump) or Gradska Deponija (city garbage dump) is industrial zone located in northern part of the city, in which city garbage dump is located.

== See also ==
- Neighborhoods of Novi Sad
