= Rimski Šančevi =

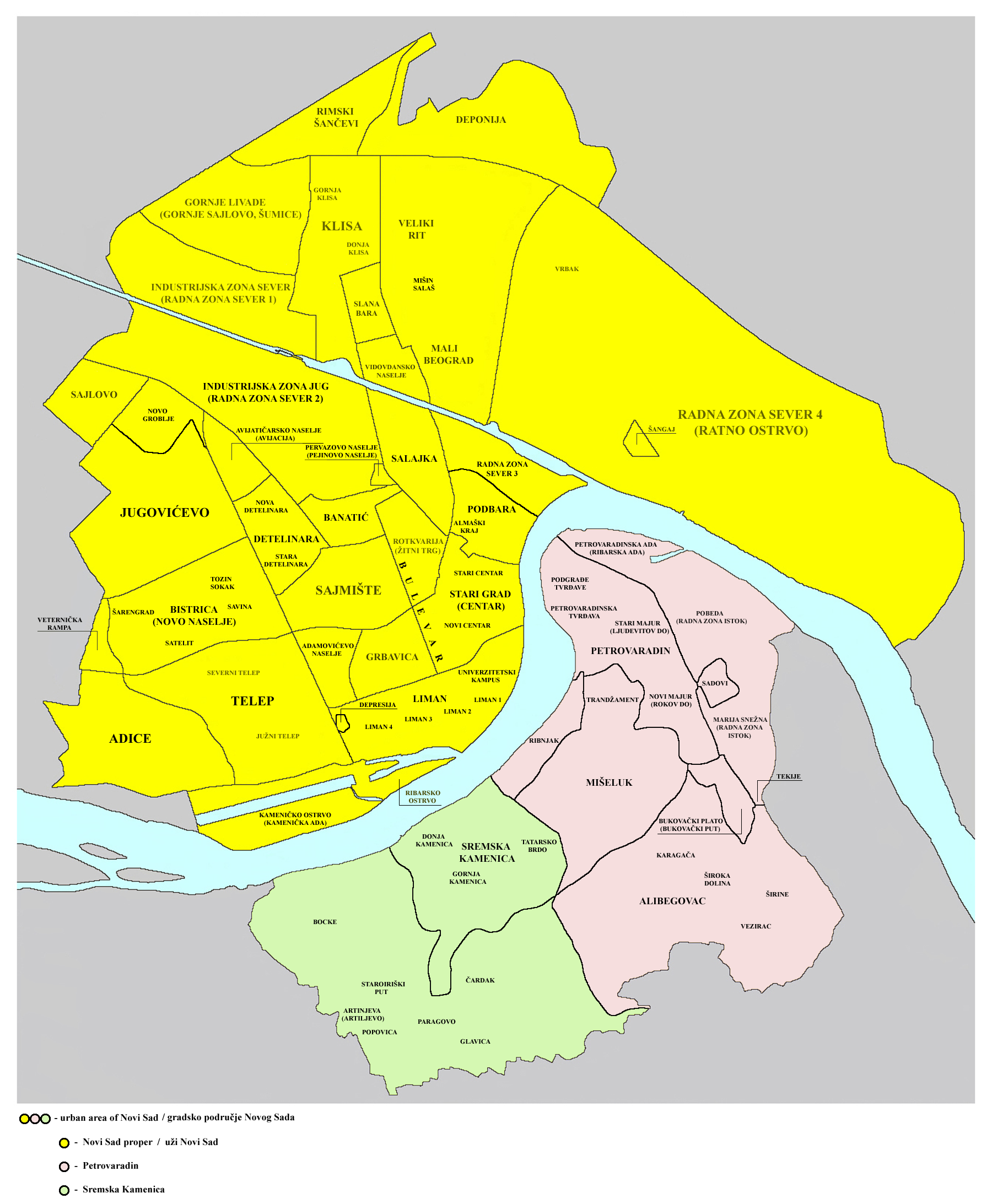
Map of the urban area of Novi Sad with city quarters, showing the location of Rimski Šančevi

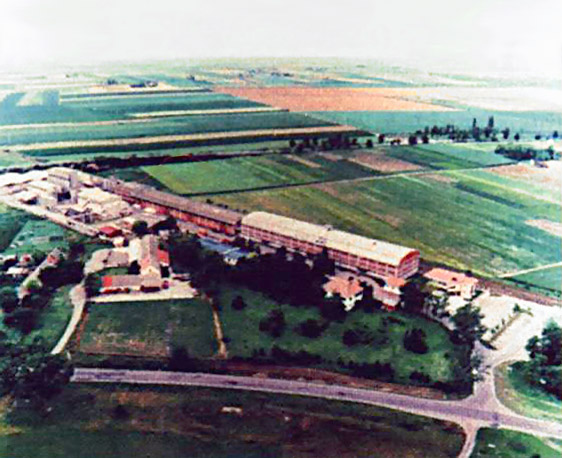
Panoramic view of Rimski Šančevi

Rimski Šančevi (Serbian: Римски Шанчеви) is an urban neighborhood of the city of Novi Sad, Serbia. It is mostly an industrial zone, but it is partially a residential area as well.

== Name ==
Its name means "the Roman trenches". It was named like this because of land shapes ("trenches") that exist at this location. Although, these land shapes are of unknown origin, they were named "rimski" (Roman) because of the popular belief that old Romans created them. However, modern researchers agree that Romans were not builders of the trenches - it is most likely that trenches were built in the 3rd and 4th century by old Sarmatians.

== Geography ==
Neighborhood is located in northern part of Novi Sad, near neighborhoods of Klisa and Gornje Livade and Deponija industrial zone.

== Features ==
There is a meteorological station in Rimski Šančevi.

== See also ==
- Neighborhoods of Novi Sad
- Industrial zones in Novi Sad
