= Avijatičarsko Naselje =

Avijatičarsko Naselje Авијатичарско Насеље
- Urban neighborhood
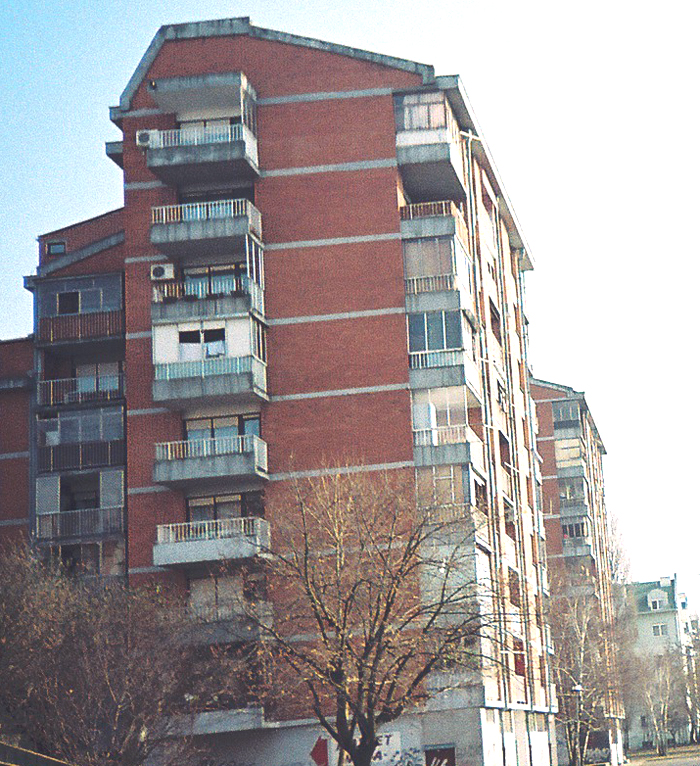
- Avijatičarsko Naselje

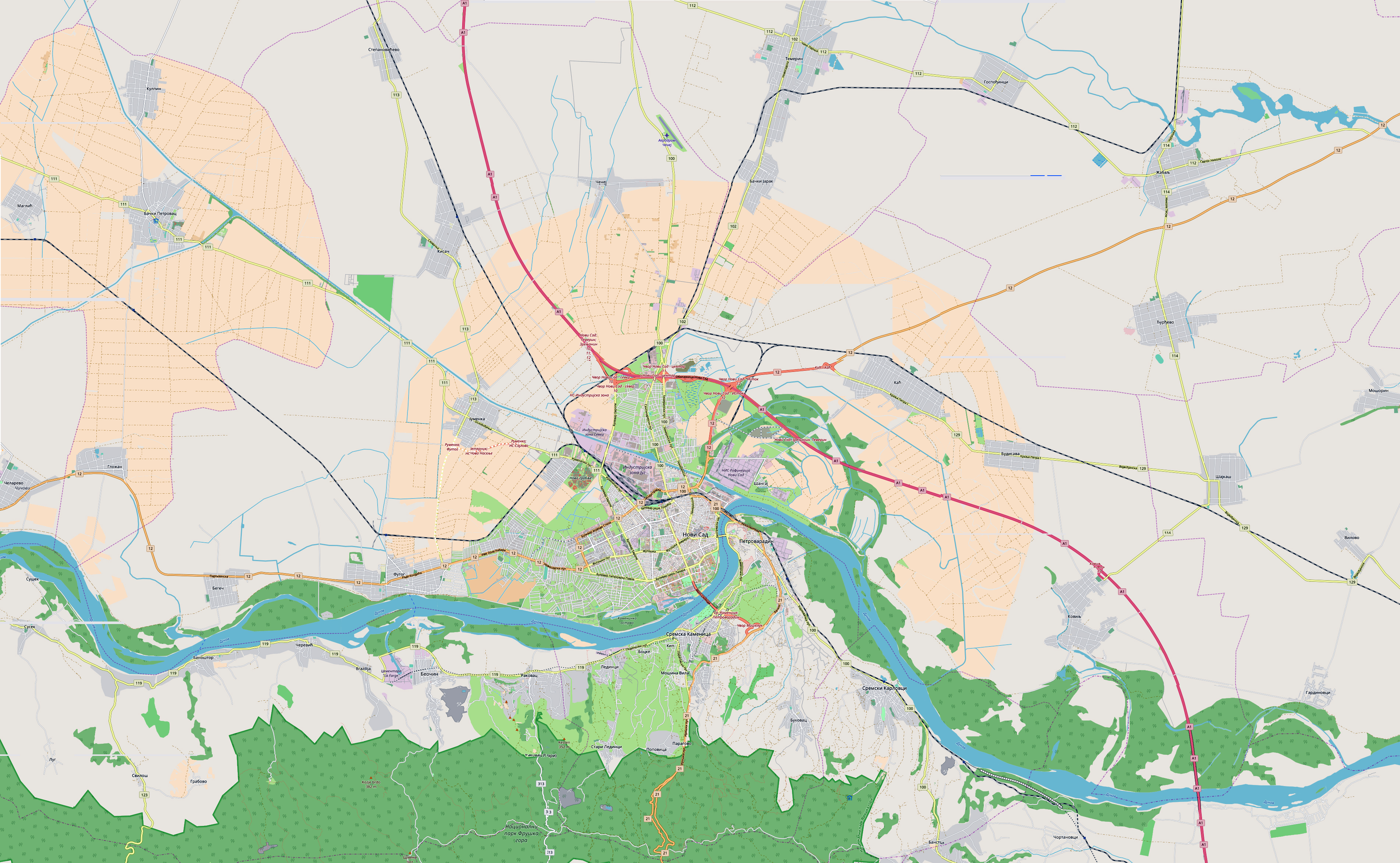
- Location within Novi Sad
- Coordinates: 45.2698°N 19.8019°E
- Country: Serbia
- Province: Vojvodina
- District: South Bačka
- Municipality: Novi Sad
- Time zone: UTC+1 (CET)
  - Summer (DST): UTC+2 (CEST)
- Area code: +381(0)21
- Car plates: NS

Avijatičarsko Naselje (Serbian: Авијатичарско Насеље), also known as Avijacija (Serbian: Авијација), is an urban neighborhood of the city of Novi Sad, Serbia.

== Borders ==
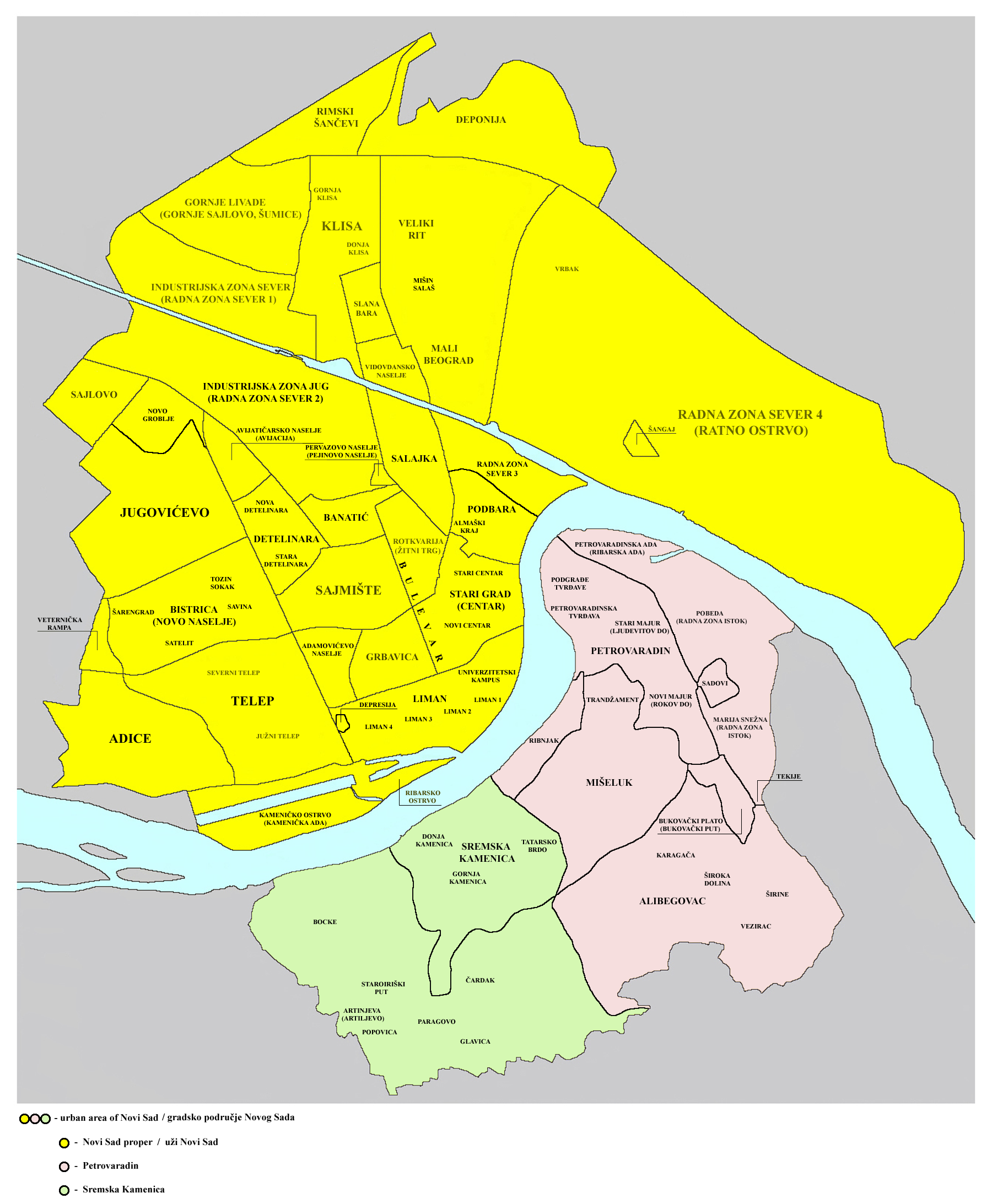
Map of the urban area of Novi Sad with city quarters, showing the location of Avijatičarsko Naselje

The south-eastern border of Avijatičarsko Naselje is Ulica Oblačića Rada (Oblačića Rada Street), the north-eastern border is Rumenački put (Rumenka Road), and the western border is a future new section of Subotički bulevar (Subotica Boulevard), which will be built in 2007.

== Neighbouring city quarters ==
The neighbouring city quarters are: Jugovićevo in the west, Detelinara in the southeast, and Industrijska Zona Jug in the northeast.

== Name and history ==
Construction of the settlement started in 1948 and it was named after Avijatičarski put (Avijatičar Road), a road that lead to the local airport.

== Famous citizens ==
The famous citizens of Avijatičarsko Naselje were literates Miroslav Antić and Ferenc Deak.

== Gallery ==
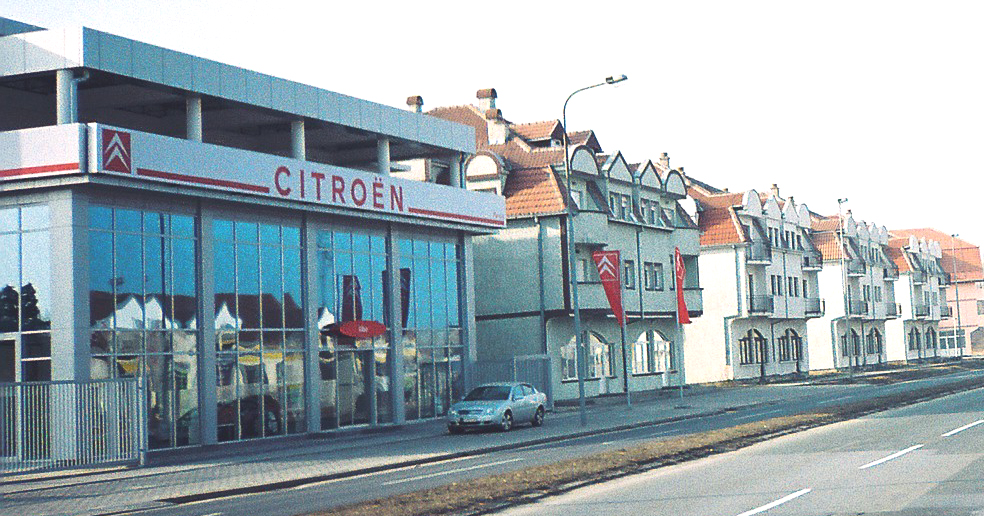
Avijatičarsko Naselje

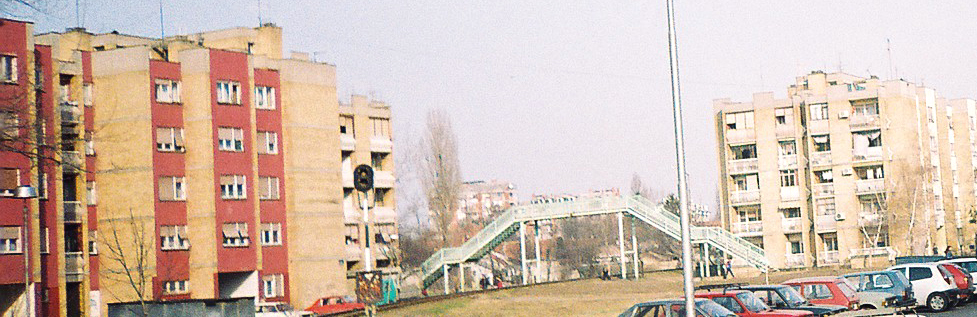
Avijatičarsko Naselje

== See also ==
- Neighborhoods of Novi Sad
