= Sajlovo =

Sajlovo Сајлово
- Urban neighborhood
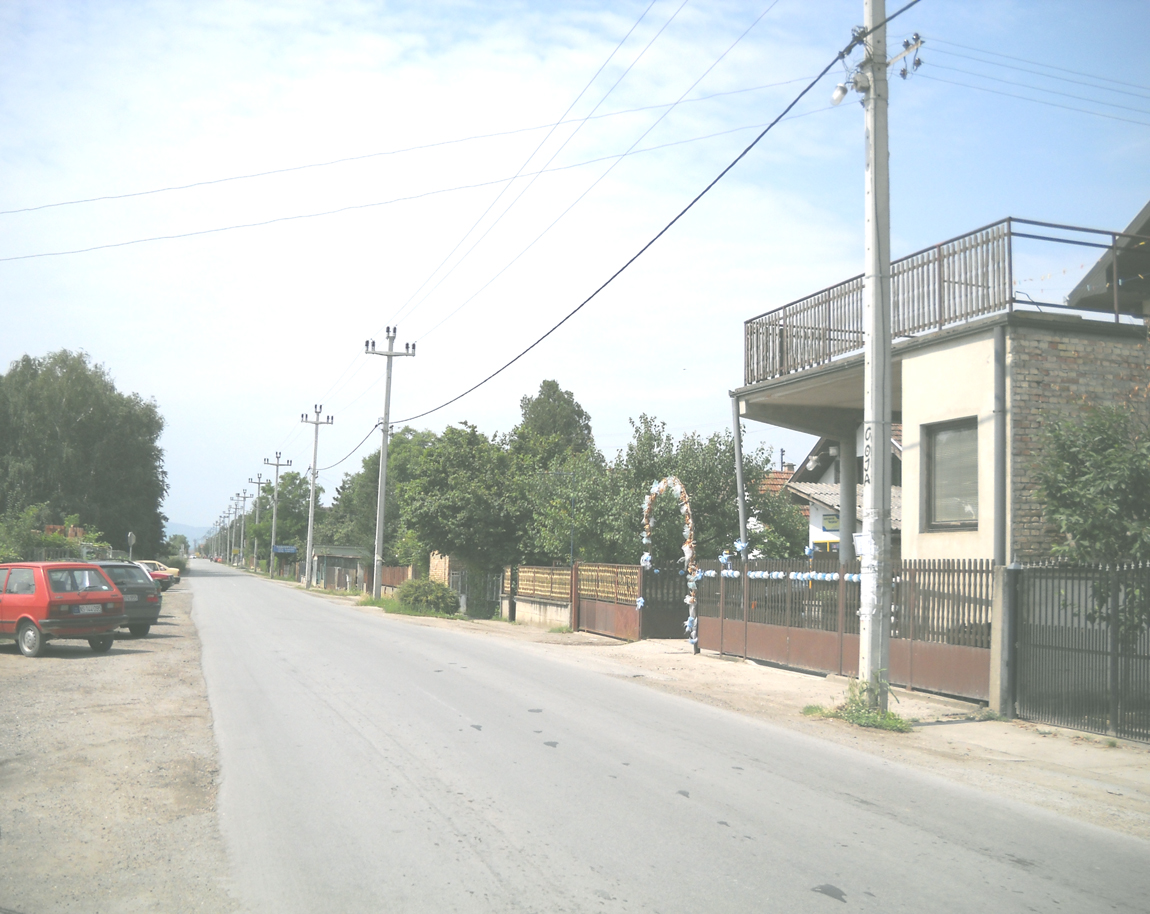
- Sajlovo

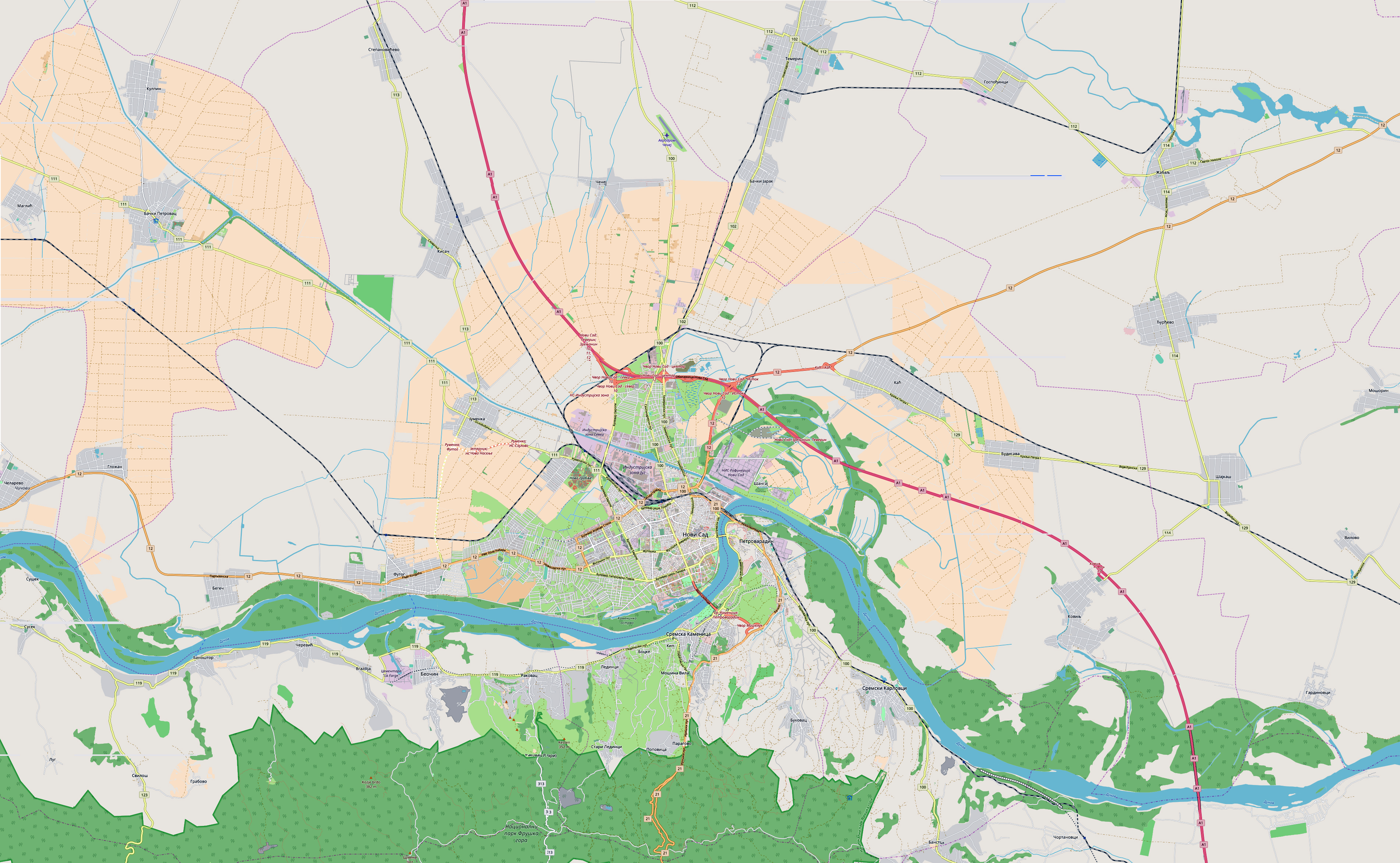
- Location within Novi Sad
- Coordinates: 45°16′30.51″N 19°46′45.62″E
- Country: Serbia
- Province: Vojvodina
- District: South Bačka
- Municipality: Novi Sad

Area
  - Total: 3.69 km^{2} (1.42 sq mi)
- Time zone: UTC+1 (CET)
  - Summer (DST): UTC+2 (CEST)
- Area code: +381(0)21
- Car plates: NS

Sajlovo (Serbian Cyrillic: Сајлово; Hungarian: Zajol) or Donje Sajlovo (Serbian Cyrillic: Доње Сајлово) is a neighborhood of the city of Novi Sad, Serbia.

== History ==
In 1237, two villages with name Sajlovo (Hungarian: Zajol), Donje Sajlovo and Gornje Sajlovo, were mentioned to exist in this area. The original name of these settlements was Isailovo. Settlements were named after monk Isaija from nearby monastery that existed in the 12th century in the east of Rumenka. Name Sajlovo/Isailovo is of Slavic origin, which indicate that these settlements were initially inhabited by Slavs.

Modern settlement of Sajlovo was mostly settled during the 1990s with Serb refugees from parts of former Yugoslavia.

== Borders ==
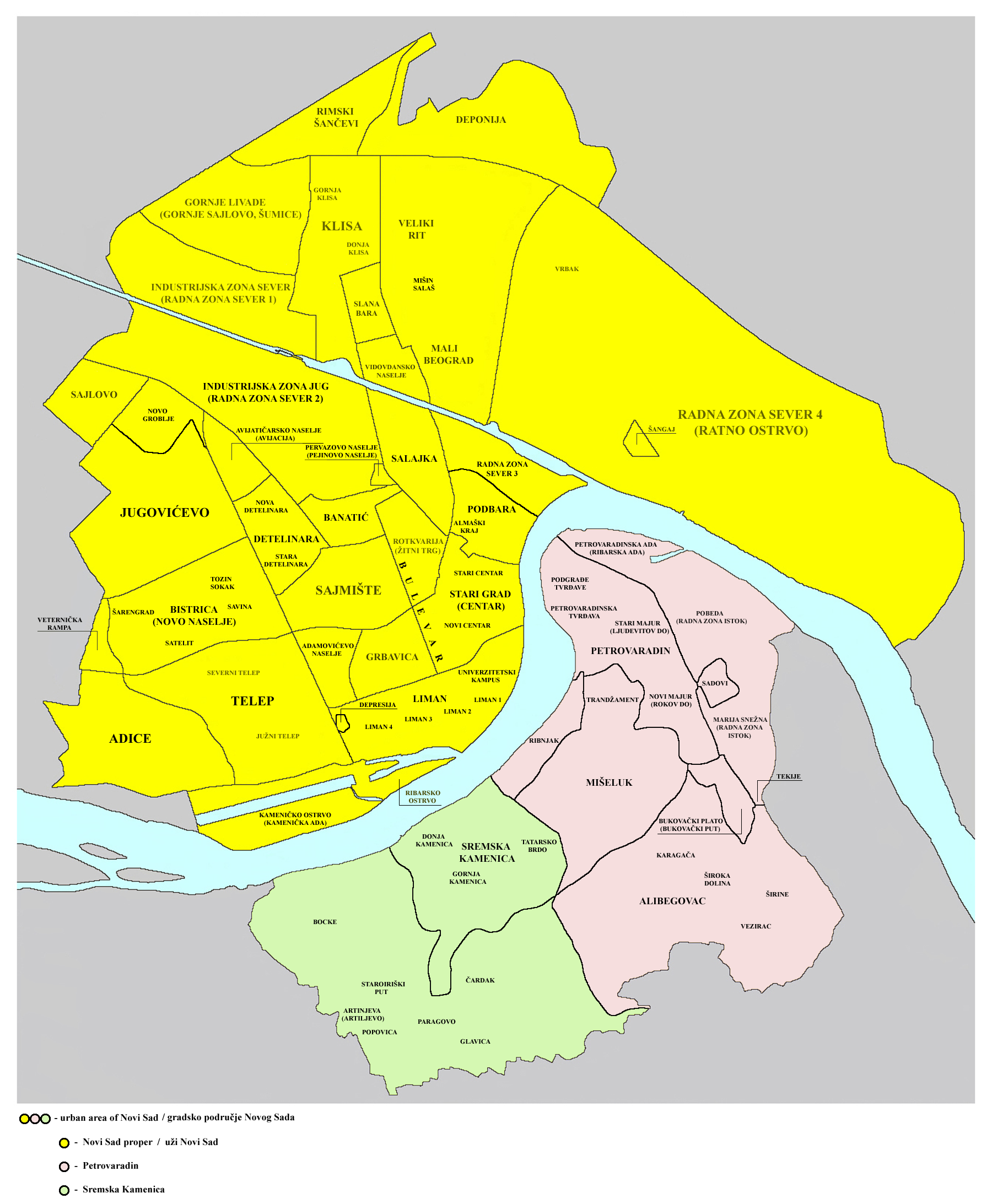
Map of the urban area of Novi Sad with city quarters, showing the location of Sajlovo

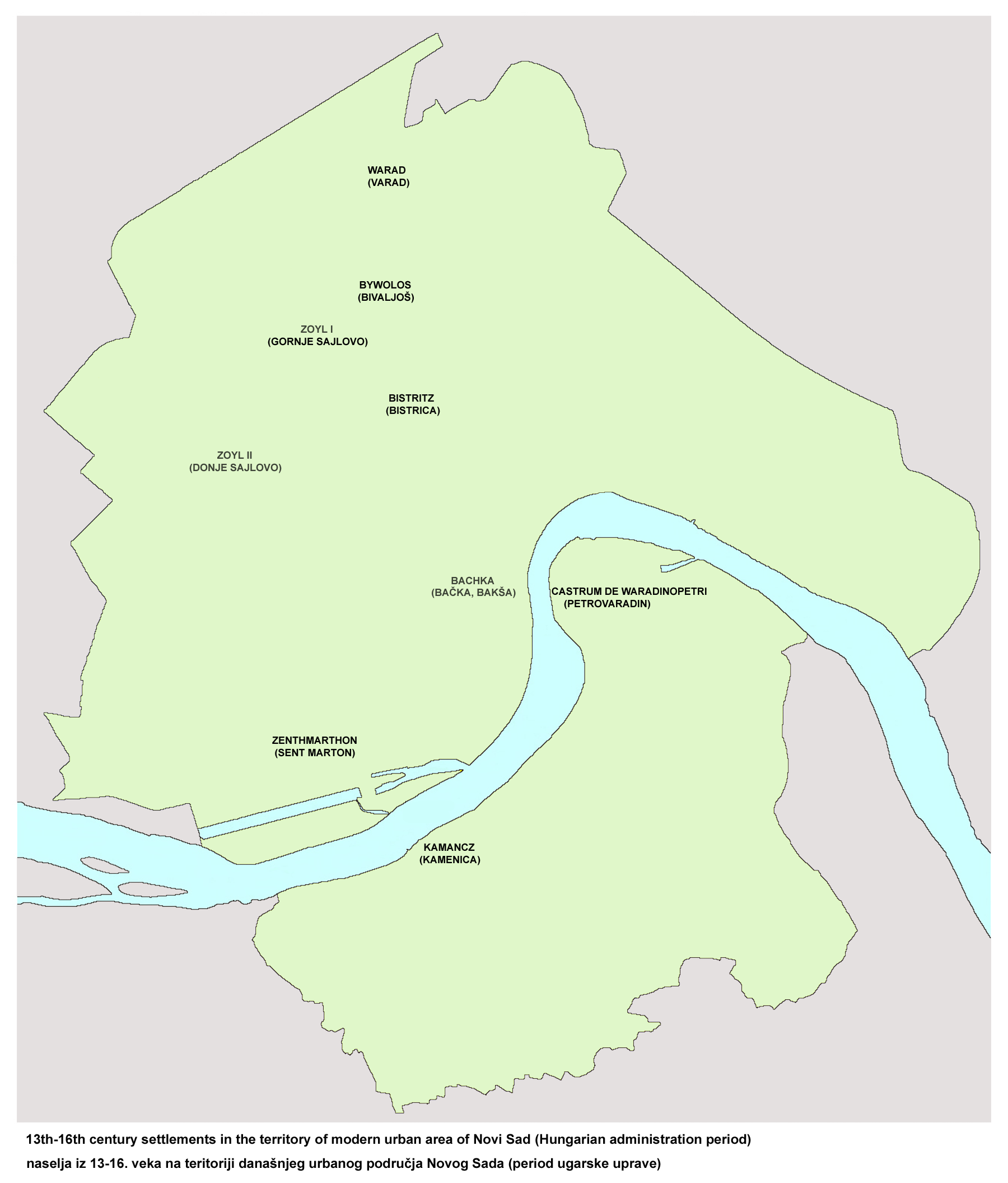
Medieval settlement of Donje Sajlovo in the location of modern Sajlovo

The north-eastern border of Sajlovo is Rumenački put (Rumenka Road), the south-eastern border is ulica Donje Sajlovo (Donje Sajlovo Street), and the western border is a western city limit of Novi Sad.

== Neighbouring city quarters ==
The neighbouring city quarters are Jugovićevo in the south-east, and Industrijska Zona Jug in the north-east.

== Gallery ==
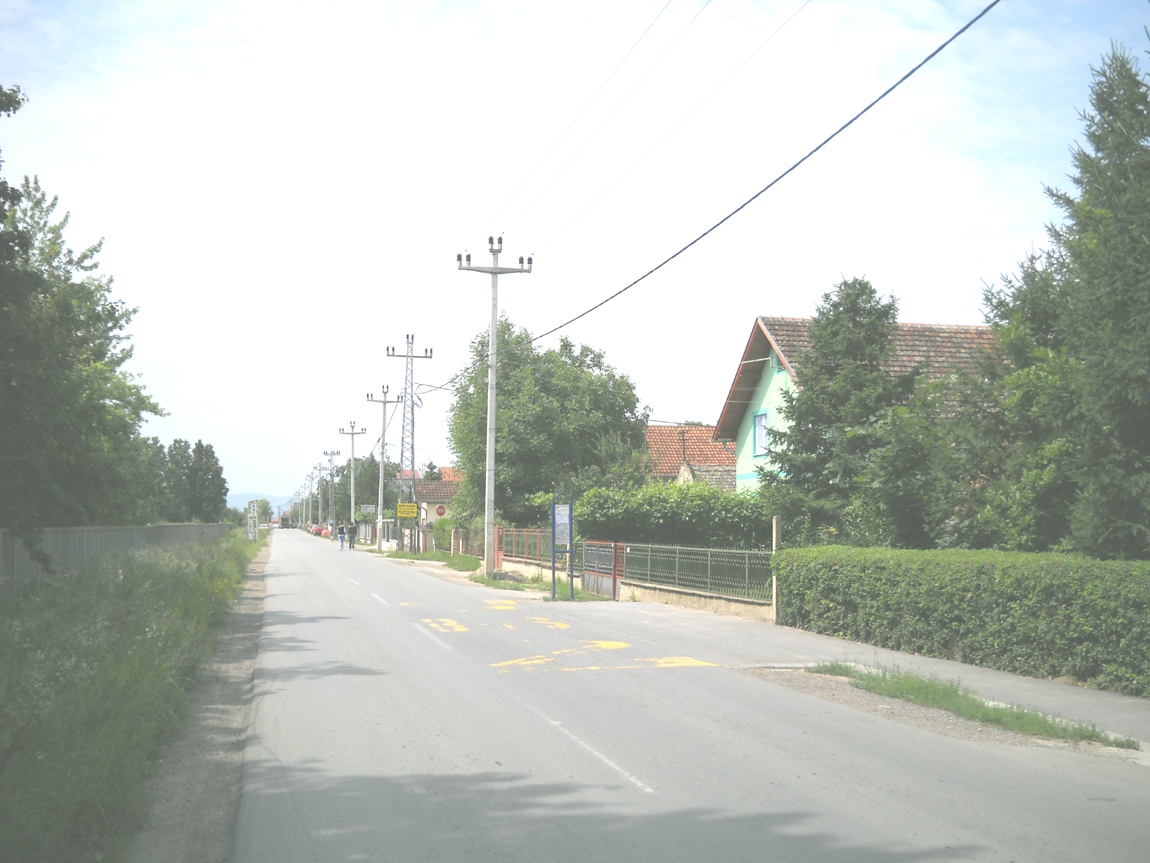
Sajlovo, Donje Sajlovo street

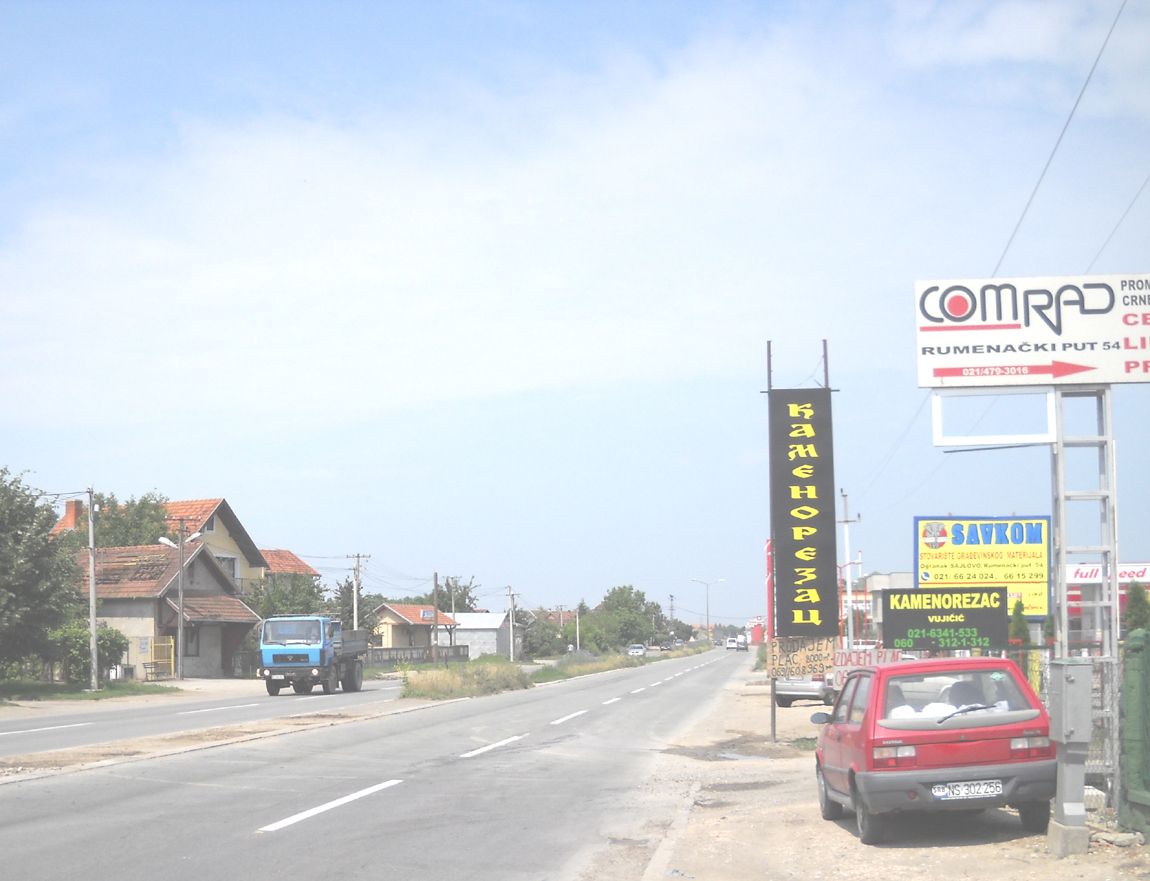
Sajlovo, Rumenački put (Rumenka road)

== See also ==
- Neighborhoods of Novi Sad
