= Satelit =

Neighborhood in Novi Sad, Serbia

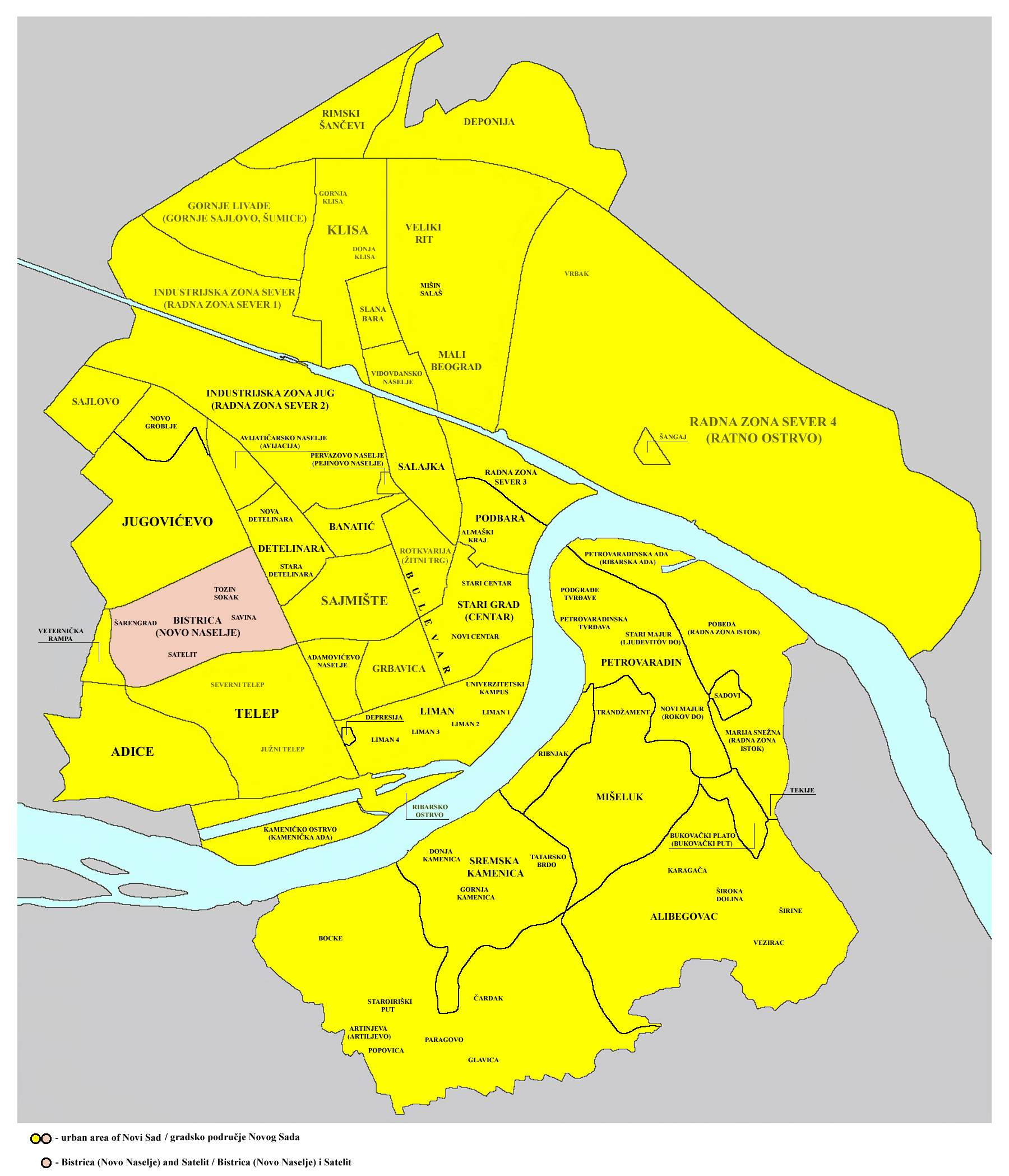
Map of the urban area of Novi Sad with city quarters, showing the location of Satelit

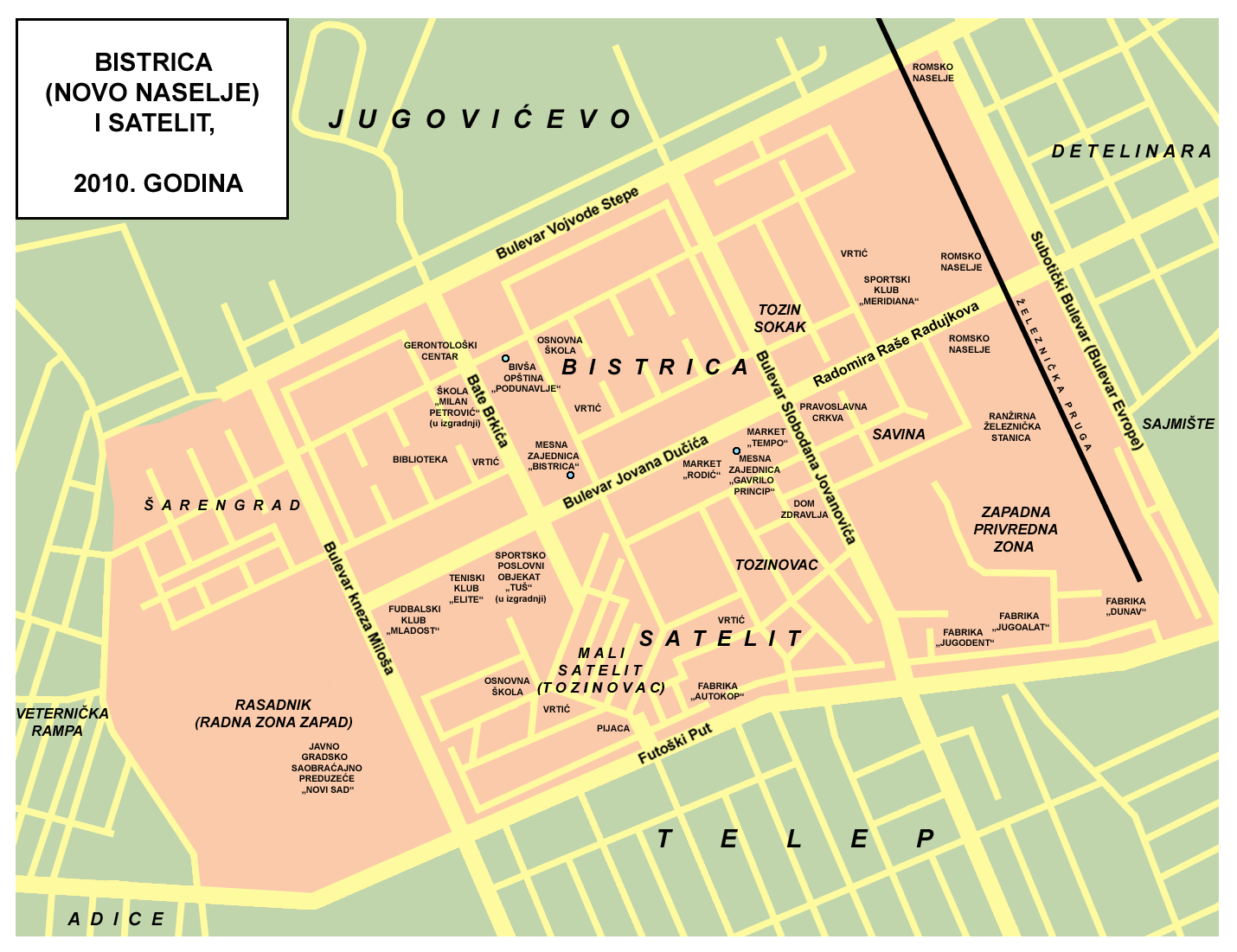
Detailed map of Satelit

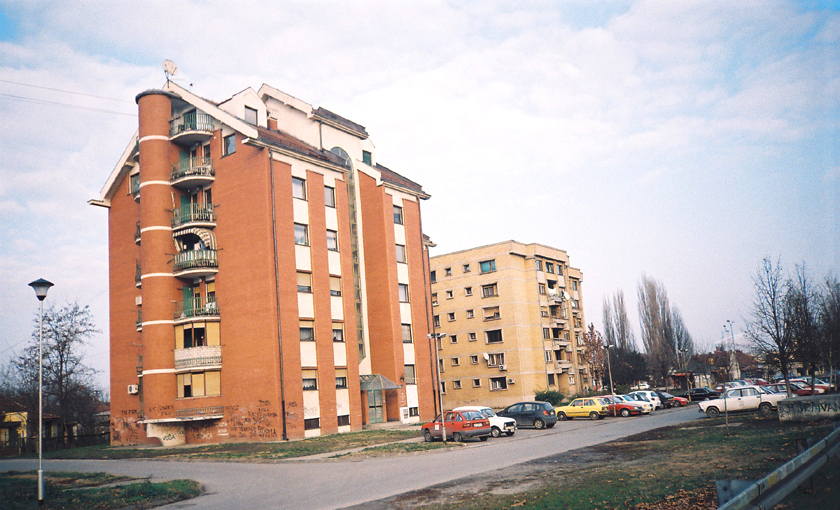
Satelit, Futoški put (Futog Road)

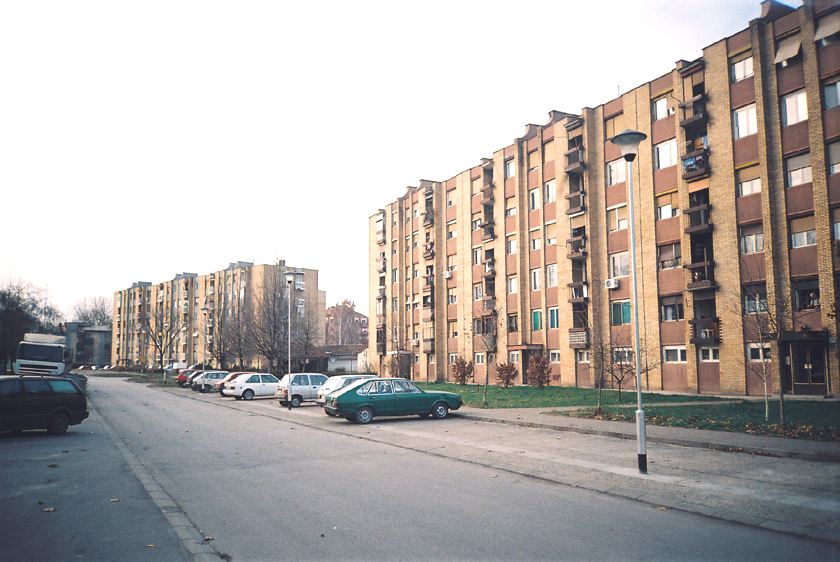
Satelit, Futoški put (Futog Road)

Satelit (Serbian Cyrillic: Сателит) is a small urban neighborhood of the city of Novi Sad, Vojvodina, Serbia. In English it translates as “Satellite”. It is part of the larger Bistrica urban area and neighborhood.

== Borders ==
The southern border of Satelit is Futoški put (Futog Road), the western border is Bulevar Kneza Miloša (Knez Miloš Boulevard), the eastern border is Bulevar Slobodana Jovanovića (Slobodan Jovanović Boulevard) and the northern border is Bulevar Jovana Dučića (Jovan Dučić Boulevard).

== Neighbouring settlements ==
The neighbouring settlements of Satelit are: Telep on the south, Novo Naselje on the north and east and Veternik on the west.

== Parts of Satelit ==
Some of the parts of Satelit are: Stari Satelit (Old Satelit) and Mali Satelit (Tozinovac).

== History ==
The construction of Satelit began in 1957, when the first houses were built in the area now known as Tozinovac. Mass construction between 1976 and 1980 merged Satelit into the New Neighborhood (Novo Naselje), later named Bistrica. Between 2000 and 2020, most of Tozinovac was dismantled to make way for the Bate Brkića Boulevard extension, connecting it with Futoša street. Several new apartment buildings were constructed in the southern parts of Bate Brkića.

== Features ==
Some of the important features of Satelit are: Satelit Market (Satelitska pijaca), "Autokop" (a factory for production of idle parts for cars), and a stadium of "Mladost" football club. There is also an elementary school "Miloš Crnjanski" in the settlement.

== Notable citizens ==
- Dara Bubamara (Rada Adžić), a popular Serbian turbo-folk singer, grew up in Satelit.

== See also ==
- Bistrica (Novo Naselje)
- Neighborhoods of Novi Sad
