= Bistrica, Novi Sad =

Bistrica Бистрица
- Urban neighborhood
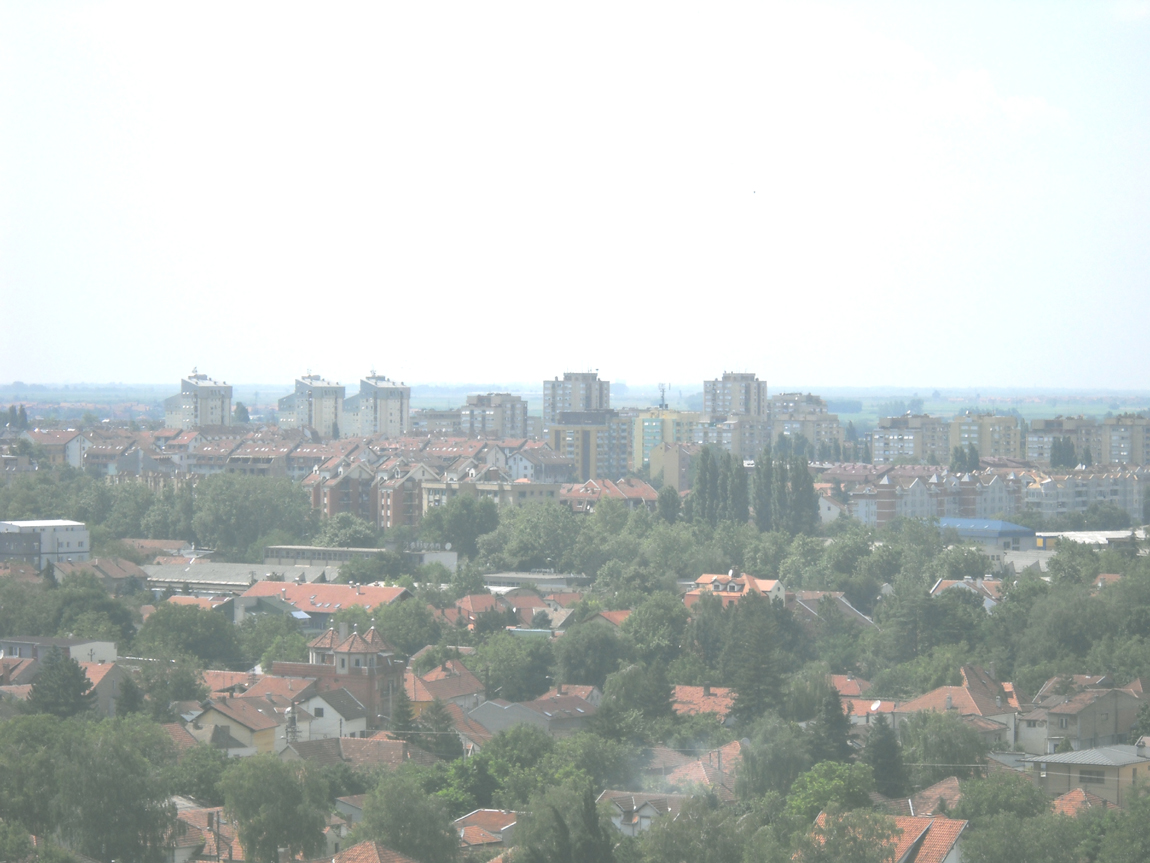
- Panoramic view of Bistrica, July 2009
- Nickname: Novo Naselje
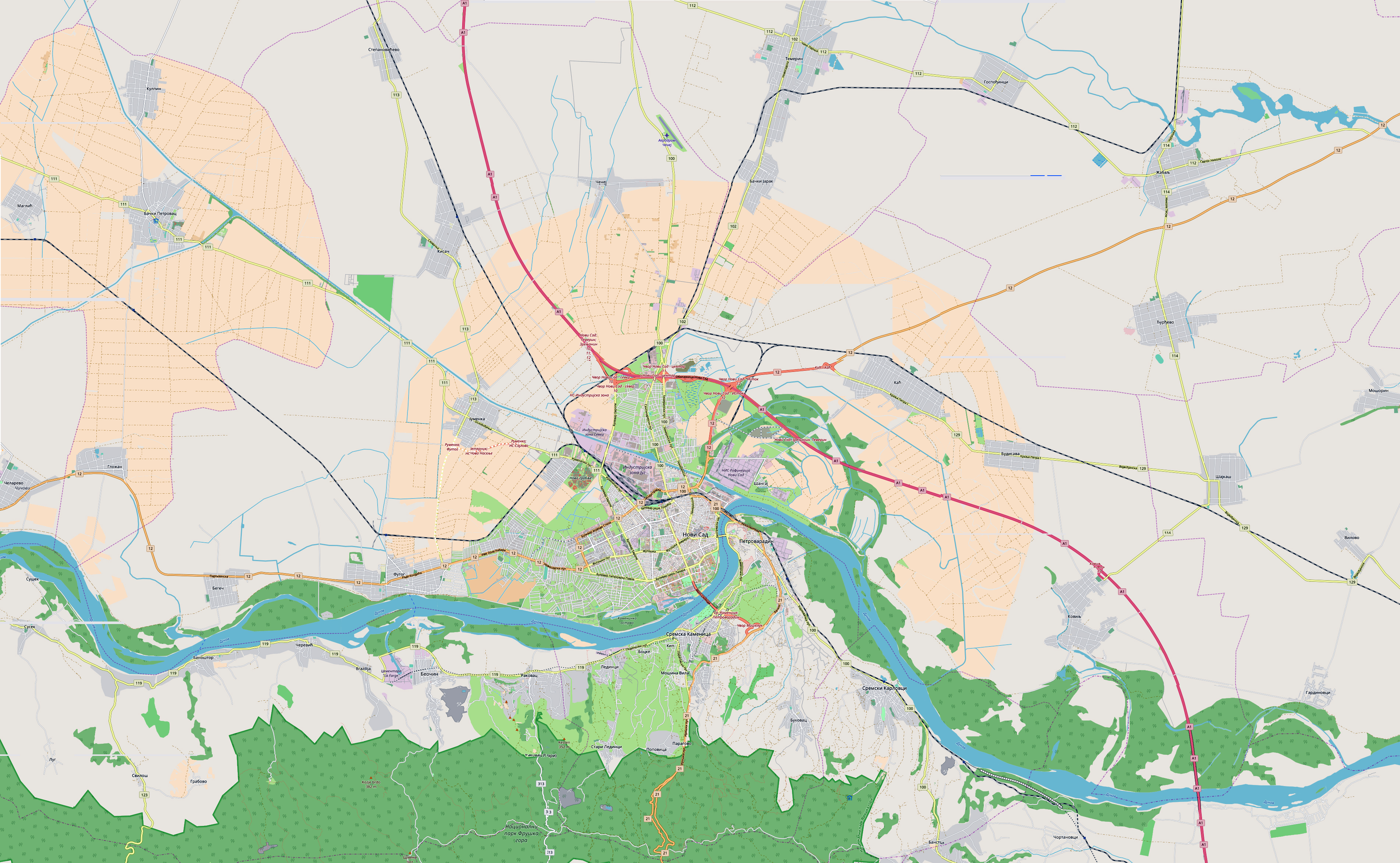
- Location within Novi Sad
- Coordinates: 45.25139°N 19.79806°E
- Country: Serbia
- Province: Vojvodina
- District: South Bačka
- Municipality: Novi Sad
- Established: 1957
- Time zone: UTC+1 (CET)
  - Summer (DST): UTC+2 (CEST)
- Area code: +381(0)21
- Car plates: NS

Bistrica (Serbian Cyrillic: Бистрица), also known as Novo Naselje (Serbian Cyrillic: Ново Насеље), is an urban neighborhood of the city of Novi Sad, Serbia. Bistrica (including Satelit) is one of the most populated urban areas of the city.

== Names ==
The old name of the settlement was Novo Naselje, but it was officially changed to Bistrica in 1992. However, most of the inhabitants of the settlement still prefer to use the old name. In Hungarian the place is known as Újtelep.

Satelit neighborhood would get its name due to the launch of the Sputnik 1 satellite in 1957, starting the space era craze, as well the neighborhood being located far from the majority of the city (as a satellite to the city).

Tozinovac neighborhood would get its name after the mayor of Novi Sad at the time, Todor Jovanović Toza.

Šonsi neighborhood would get its name after the 29th Chess Olympiad held in Novi Sad (ŠONSI-Šahovska Olimpijada Novi Sad), due to chess competitors moving in that neighborhood a year prior to the competition.

== Location ==
=== Borders ===
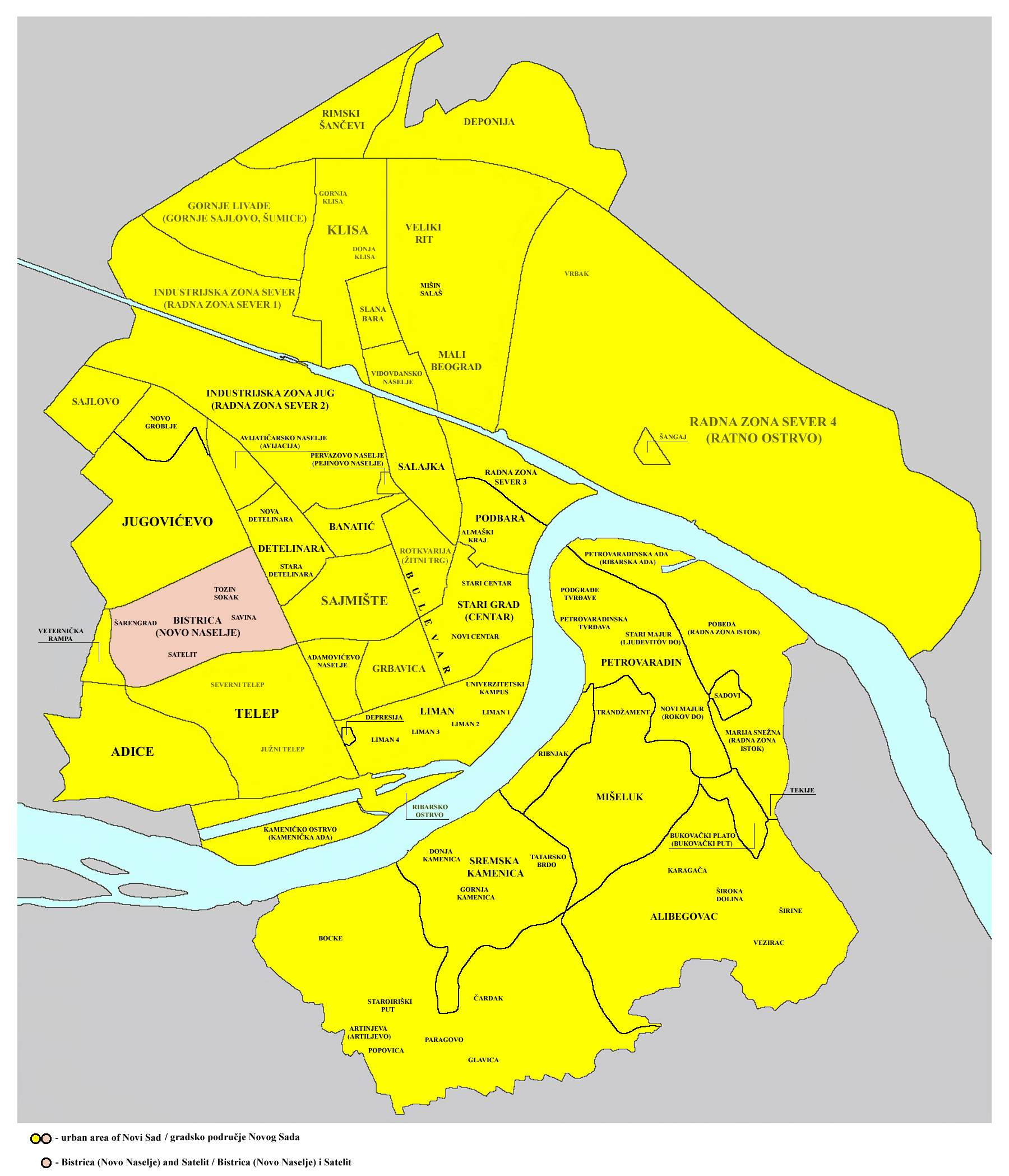
Map of the urban area of Novi Sad with city quarters, showing the location of Bistrica (Novo Naselje)

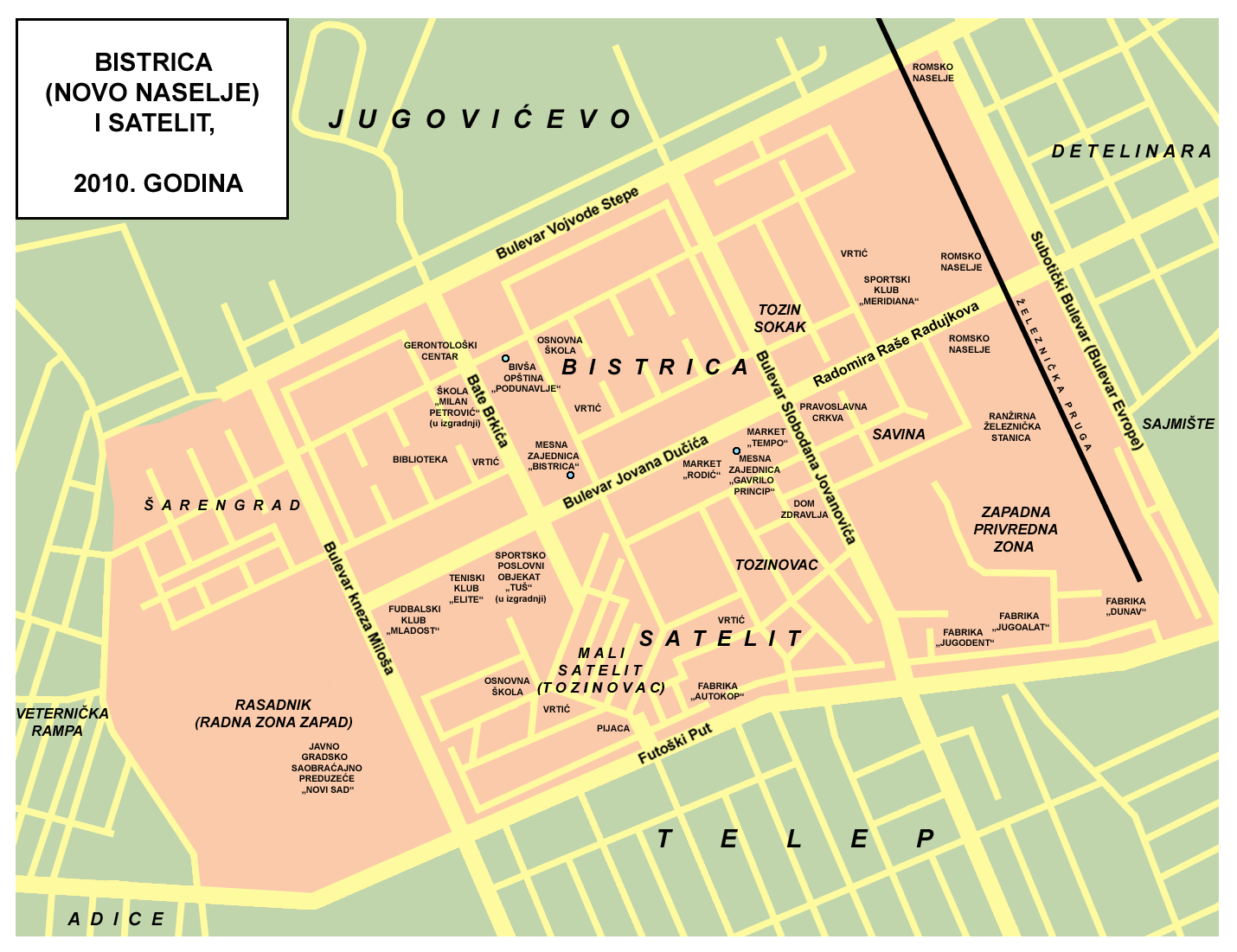
Detailed map of Bistrica (Novo Naselje)

The northern border of Bistrica is Vojvode Stepe Boulevard, the western border is Somborska rampa street, the southern border is Futoški road, and the eastern border is Subotički Boulevard or Europe Boulevard.

The neighbouring settlements are: Jugovićevo in the north, Veternička Rampa in the west, Telep in the south, and Sajmište and Detelinara in the east.

=== Parts of the neighborhood ===
Some of the parts of Bistrica are: Savina, Tozin Sokak (Šonsi), Šarengrad (Jamajka), Satelit (a separate settlement in the past), Mali Satelit (Little Satelit, a part of Satelit), Tozinovac (a part of Satelit), Rasadnik (Radna Zona Zapad), Zapadna Privredna Zona.

== History ==
=== Name origin ===
According to old maps from the 16th and 17th centuries, the old Serbian village of Bistrica existed in the area of today's Novi Sad, before the city was founded in 1694. It is not known what happened with the old settlement, since from the 18th century the place has not been mentioned on any of the existing maps. The official name of the modern neighborhood was given from the name of this village.

In 1528, the cartographer Lazarus drew a map of the area where Novi Sad is located today, where the site called Bistritz (Bistrica) was located. The mention of Bistrica on the old maps was researched by the historian Pavle Stanojević, former director of the Vojvodina Archive. The name Bistrica was mentioned on seven maps dating back to the 16th and 17th centuries. On them, a neighborhood at the other side of the Petrovaradin Fortress was called Bistrica. Among other things, the name appears on the map of the famous Flemish cartographer Gerardus Mercator (1512-1594), who placed the cartography on a strictly scientific basis.

Name Bistrica is of Slavic origin (notably Serbian) that denotes a fast river or stream. Toponyms bistrica and bistra are common among Slavs, and appear in all areas where Serbs have lived.

According to Ammianus Marcellinus, a fourth-century Roman historian, there existed a Roman villa called Pistrensis Villa, on the left bank of the Danube. Here the future Roman Empress Constantia, wife of Emperor Gratain, was almost captured by Sarmatians. She barely escaped to Sirmium. According to some opinions, Slavic Bistrica from later time period might be a corruption of Pistrensis. Jacob Hofmann in his Lexicon of Universal History, 1698, mentions the place. This would actually date the origin of name of the area to at least 374 ad.

It is not possible to say with certainty which part of today's Novi Sad was the location of the old settlement of Bistrica. There is no evidence that it was located in the area of the modern neighborhood of the same name. Archaeologists have found the remains of a medieval village in the Bistrica-Novo Naselje area, although they did not identify them with old Bistrica. It is thought that these remains are actually part of the former settlement of Donje Sajlovo.

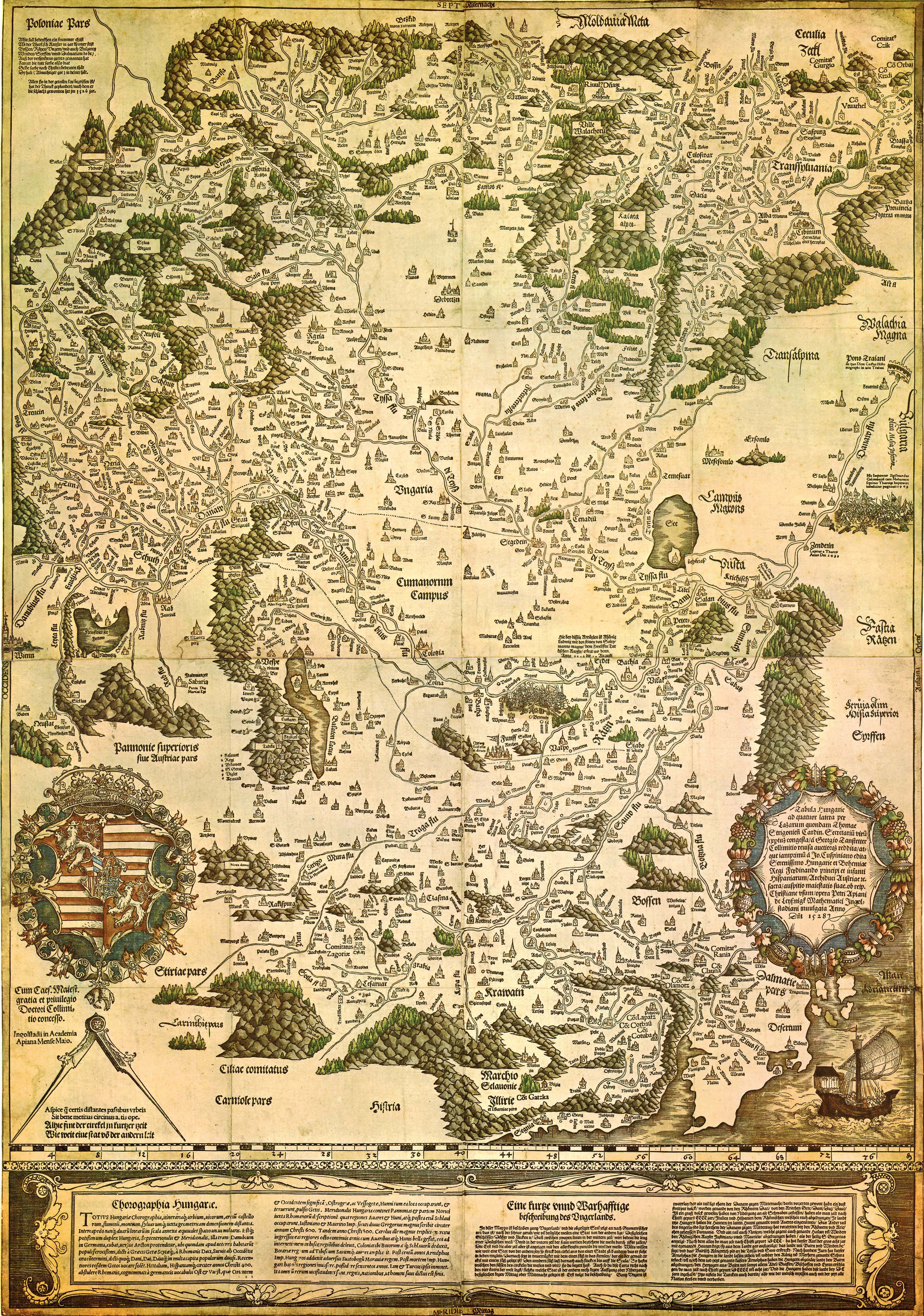
Old settlement of Bistrica (Bistritz), cartographer Lazarus, Tabula Hungariae, 1528

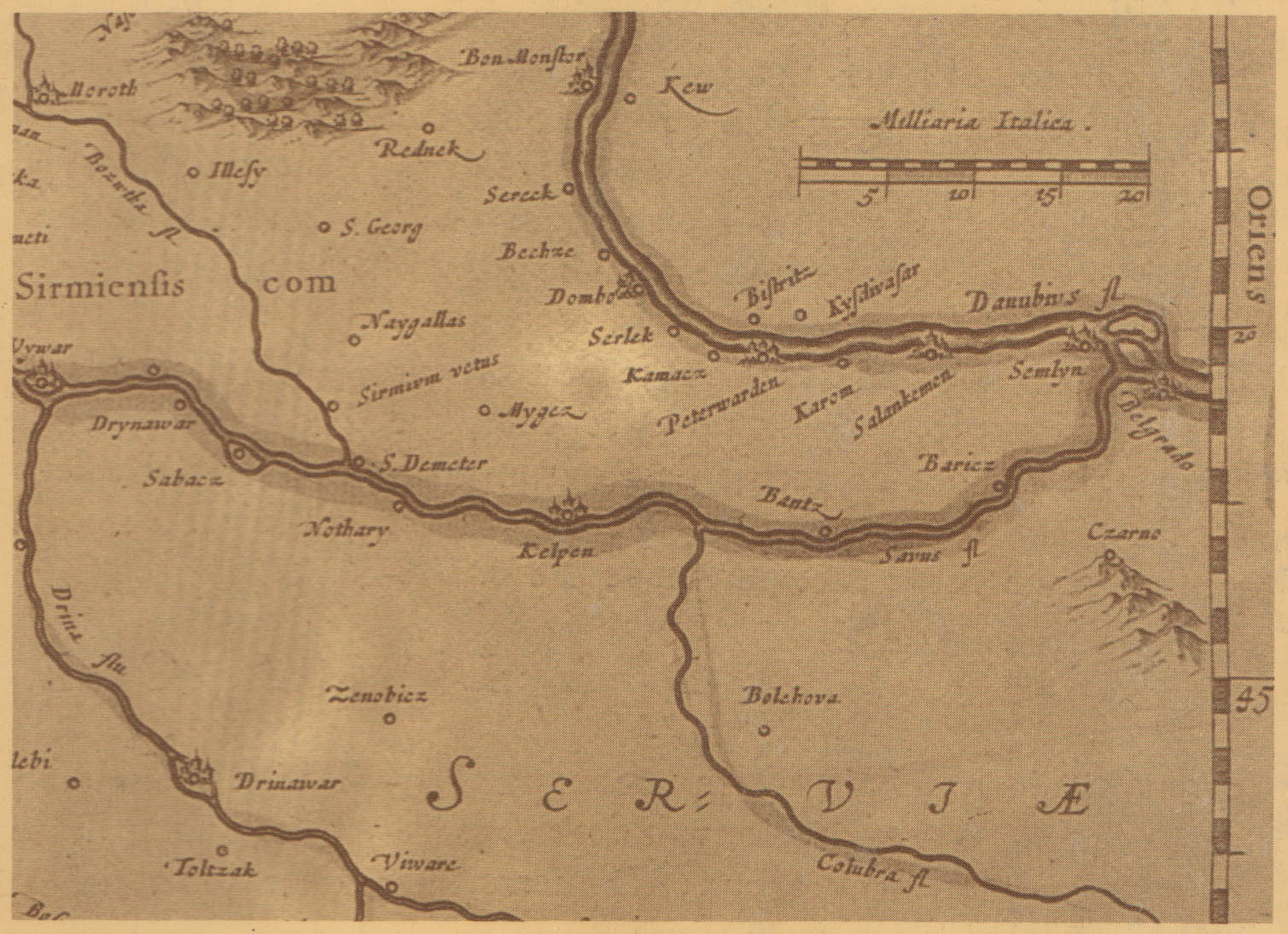
Old settlement of Bistrica (Bistritz), cartographer Gerardus Mercator, 16th century

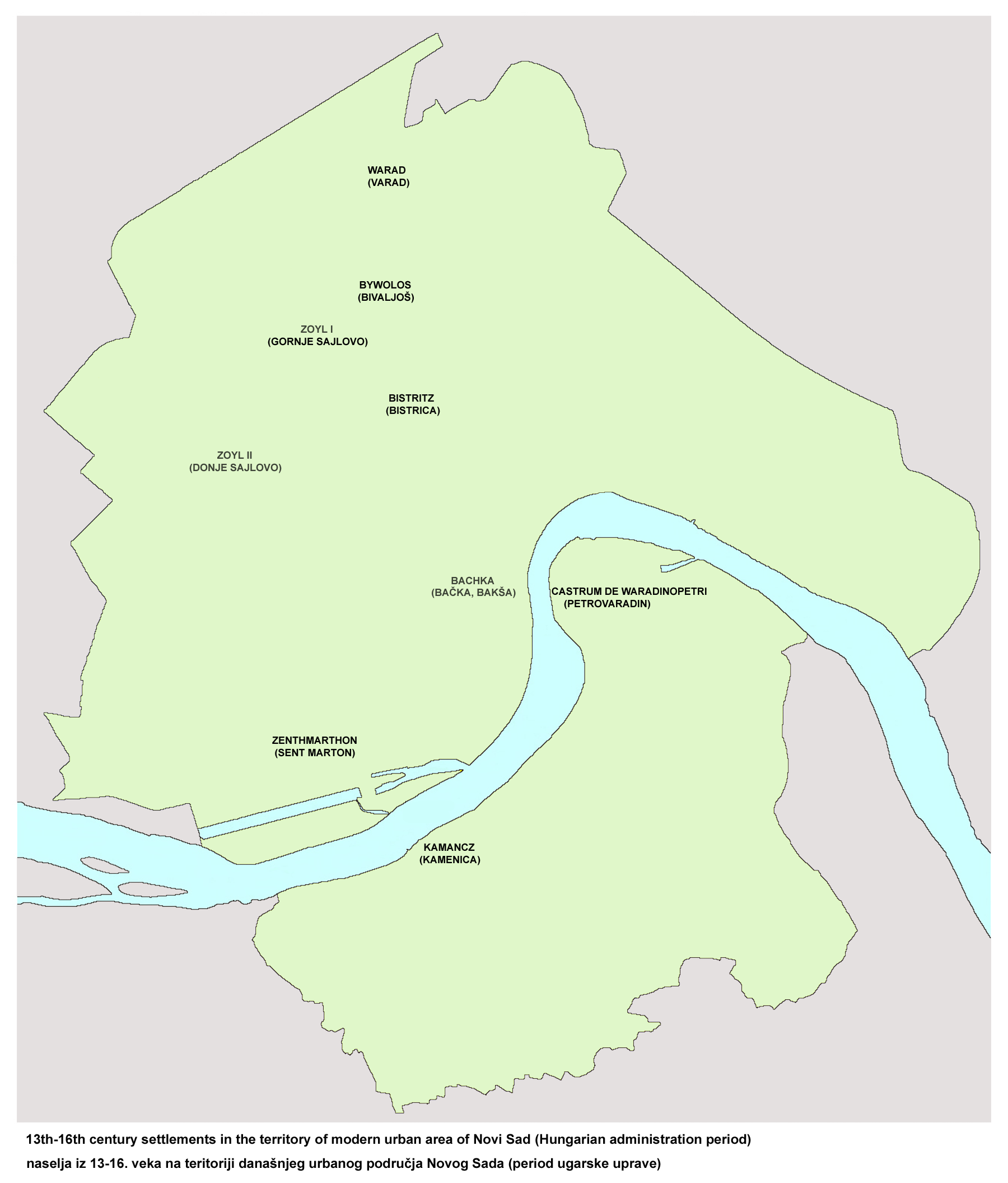
Old settlement of Bistrica in the location of modern Novo Naselje (early 16th century)

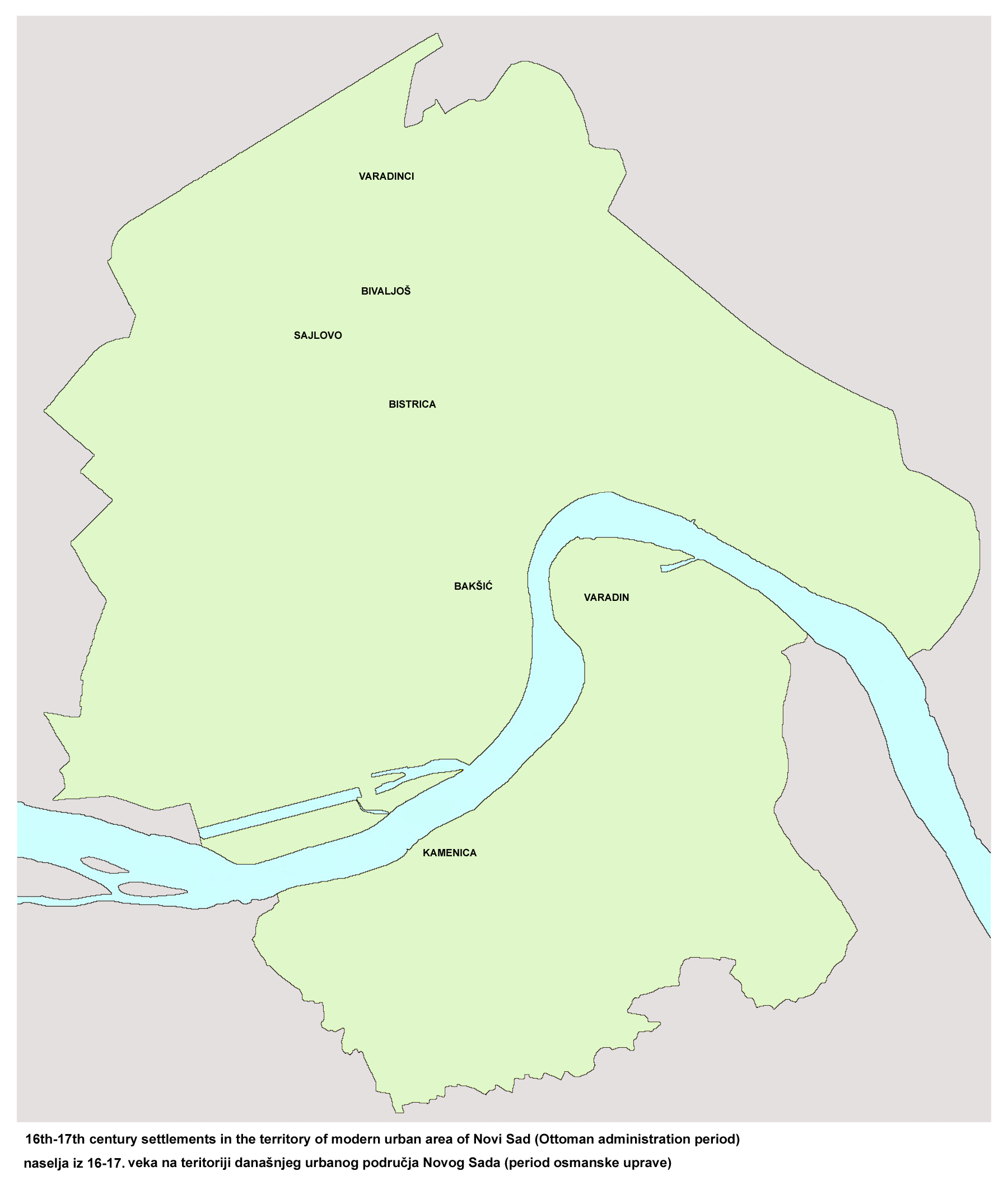
Old settlement of Bistrica in the location of modern Novo Naselje (Ottoman administration period, 16th-17th century)

=== Woods and picnic grounds ===
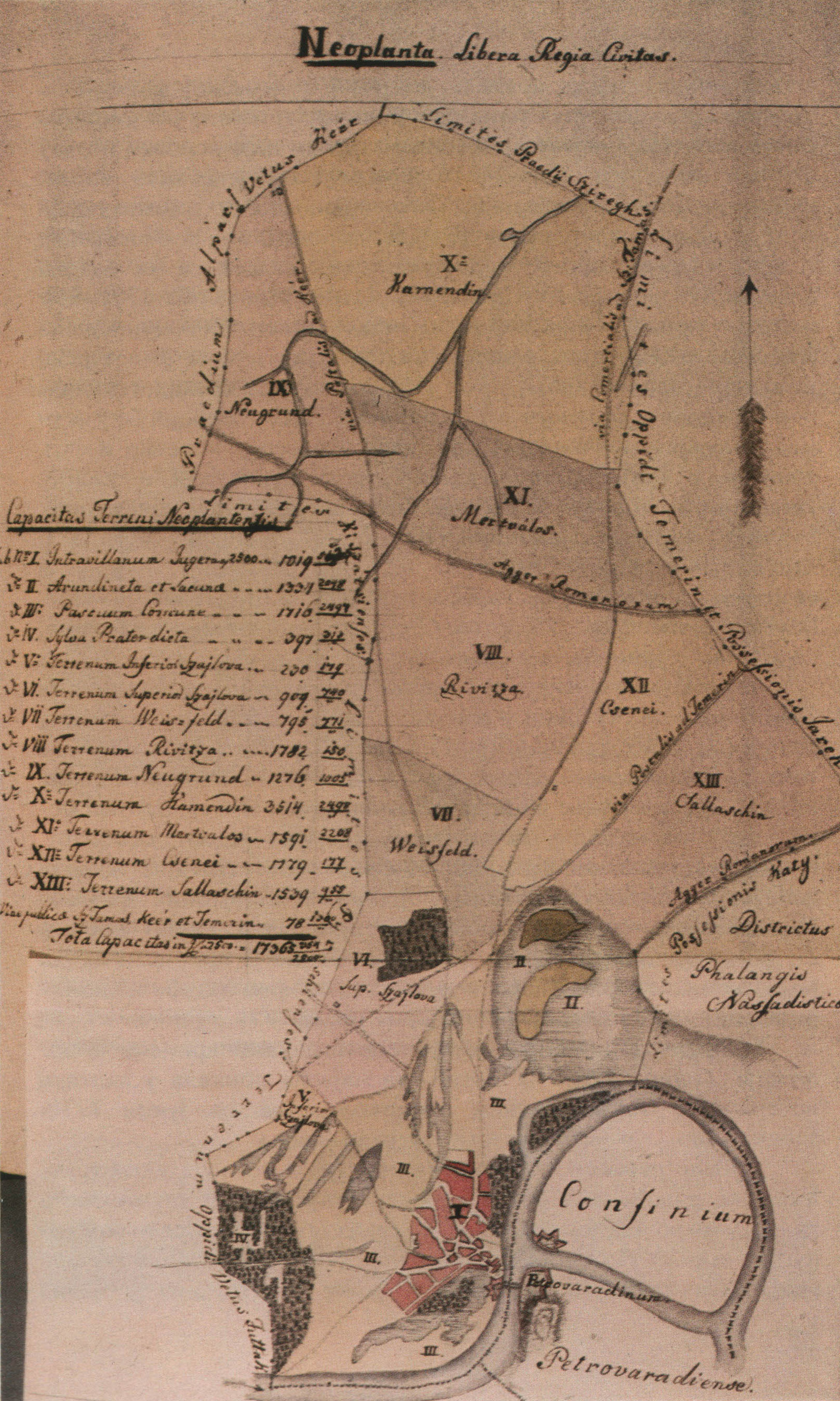
Forests in the area of modern-day Bistrica neighborhood, map of Novi Sad, 1805

It is indisputable that there were two larger forests in the area of today's Bistrica neighborhood during the Middle Ages: Gornja (Upper) and Donja (Lower). The Gornja (or Čenejska) forest was in the northwestern part of modern Bistrica neighborhood, towards Sajlovo, while Donja forest, with an area of about 340 hectares, was in the southern part of the modern Bistrica neighborhood. They were vibrant woods, full of tough lichen, oaks, elm trees and poplars.

The first issues that came with the legal rights to use this space came after 1748, when Novi Sad became the free royal city with its own administration. At this time, there were squabbles between the city administration and the rulers from Futog over the land boundaries, including the water passages. Because of the unresolved ownership problems, the workers of the Futog estates would break the water embankments. At that time, the Donja Forest relied on the Futog Forest. Through these forests, a road passed to Futog, then to Vienna and the rest of Central Europe. The last of the Futog rulers was Count Chotek.

After the elongations, Novi Sad residence would make the Donje Forest into a picnic ground, 6 kilometers away from the center of the city. At the beginning of the forest, the alleys and playgrounds have been decorated in the style of similar parks in Vienna, which is why the residence of Novi Sad named this part of the forest Prater. In front of Prater was the Pejić family tavern, which was set on fire during the Hungarian Rebellion. In the Hungarian Rebellion (or the Serbian Movement), between 1848 and 1849, the Donje forest was severely damaged due to extensive logging.

The Magistrate tried to restore the thinning forest by planting saplings in the period of 1874–1876. In 1877, a section was set aside for the Bostanluk, but due to the pressures of mostly the Rotkvarija residence, the forest was increasingly shrinking and slowly disappearing.

After the First World War, the last parts of the forest was gone. Accounts from older Novi Sad residence tell of three poplar trees that were the last remnant of the Donje forest that were cut down after World War II when Jugoalat was built.

The northern part of this territory was mostly grassland, and since 1913 was the location of the first Novi Sad airport. After World War II, the airport was transferred to Batajnica for strategic reasons. A reminder of the old airport can be found at the famous "Pilot" pub in the center of Detelinara neighborhood.

=== Constructions of the 1950s–1960s ===
According to the book by Dr. Slobodan Ćurčić (Naselja Bačke - geografske karakteristike, Novi Sad, 2007), houses existed in the eastern part of today's Satelit neighborhood as early as 1952. Construction on this site continued from 1956 to 1957, with construction of first houses and buildings in the central Satelit area known as Tozinovac. This building phase lasted with extreme intensity until 1963. The first elementary school in the neighborhood, Miloš Crnjanski (originally named Boris Kidrič), was built in 1962.

=== Constructions of the 1970s–1990s ===
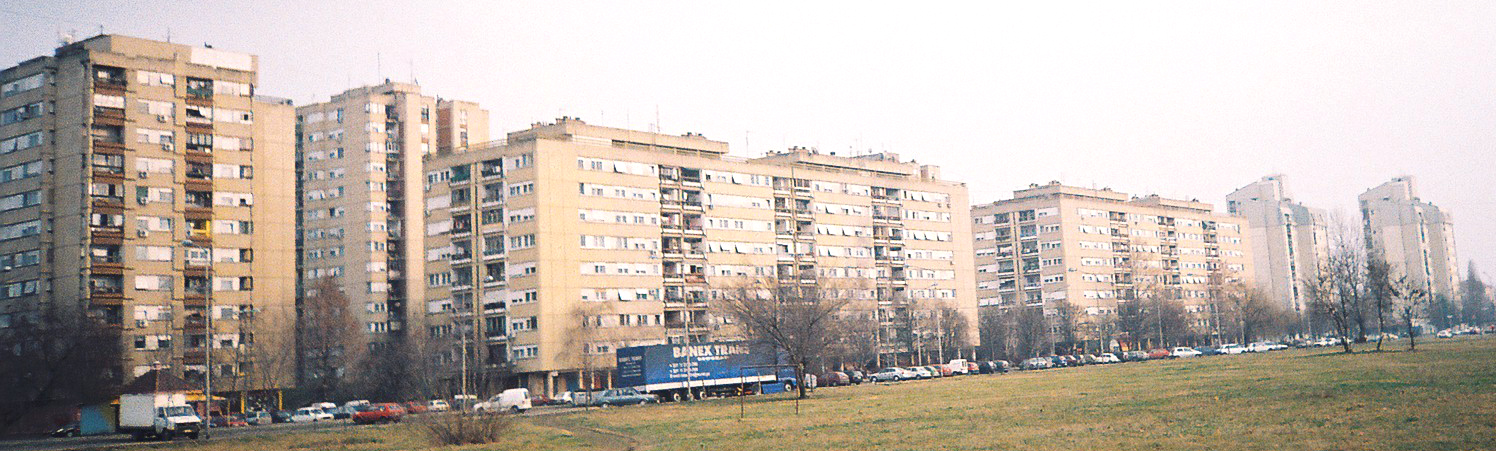
Bistrica, Bate Brkića Boulevard, January 2006

In the first General Urban Plan of Novi Sad after World War II in 1950, the city had no plan for the areas north of Satelit. Rodoljub Radosavljević, architect and urban planner for the Novi Sad City Planning Institute between 1960 and 1998, revised the General Urban Plan in 1963, which established the concept of Novo Naselje. In early 1978 Dr. Natalija Nataša Reba was appointed, as deputy director of the Construction Land Institute, as the head of social-oriented construction in Novo Naselje, and her husband Blagoje Reba (1938-2002) designed a large number of the housing units in Novo Naselje.

The first buildings outside of the Satelit neighborhood were constructed in Bate Brkića street (today's 18-26 street numbers) by the Neimar enterprise (which would be responsible for most of the building construction in the coming decades). Those first high rises were wide buildings, with 8 stories of residential apartments as well as space for local shops, craftsmen, merchants and lodges.

From 1978, construction continued after a short pause. In late February, rapid snow melt would cause underground water issues, due to the neighborhood being located in a wetland environment. In some areas the water was half a meter deep, with some buildings (A-4) having its foundations submerged in a pool of water. The city would place several cisterns that would continuously pump out the water until the issue was resolved.

Out of 25 residential buildings that were being constructed, 14 of them were being built in the then new IMV Žeželj system, which was used in the construction of buildings in Liman III and IV.

The "Bačkopalanačkog odreda" Road (Bačkopalanačkog Squad) was the main road in this neighborhood. Most of the major buildings were constructed along that road. With new building methods, this street would expand into a boulevard, being renamed into the Jovana Dučića Boulevard in 1991.

While the first buildings were finished in November 1978, with final technical admissions and processes being done for obtaining licenses for use. There were delays to connect the buildings to the city heating system that were resolved in February, with the construction of the first neighborhood Heating station (19 February with heated water; 24 February with headed rooms). On 19 March 1979, the first residence moved in building A1-4 with 54 apartments. The second building, A1-3, would have its residence move in several days later. In April, building A2-2 with 126 apartments. Novi Sad bank would move in building A1-1. The post office and flower shop moved in building A1-2 where they are located to this day.

Concerted mass construction reached its peak between 1978 and 1980. This was also a period when the settlement received its present constitution. At that time 4,250 apartments were built, with reconstruction and complete construction of municipal buildings (roads, water supply, heat supply, sewage, electricity, telephone lines) was carried out.

With the new elements from the General Urban Plan of 1985, Novo Naselje would expand westward. Most of the buildings would be fully built and occupied between the 1980s and 1990s (Šonsi neighborhood in 1989 with 280 apartments; Šarengrad in 1995). By the summer of 1994, another 8,728 apartments were built.

==== First markets ====
While unofficially a market existed in the area before 1968, beginning of that year would see the construction of the first official modern green market in the neighborhood, with 139 desks and 22 booths for selling green produce such as bostana. The market would be finished in July of that year and named Satelit fresh market.

On 13 August 1979, the neighborhood would get its first grocery store in the form of a kiosk named Centroslavije (between buildings A1-3 and A1-4). Soon after Podunavlje enterprise from Beočin would open up a shop.

Between 1980 and 1981 began the construction of the Stoteks department store (later named "Mladost"). The ground floor of the building would be used by several supermarket chains throughout its history, with the upper floor later used by a Chinese department store.

==== School at Novo Naselje ====
At the end of 1978 began the construction of the second school in the neighborhood by the plans of architect Albert Josipović from the Institute of Physical Culture of Vojvodina. Taking up 7,100 square meters, Prva vojvođanska brigada, would be located in Seljačkih Buna street. First students would be accepted in the 1980/1981 school year, with all construction work being completed in 1981. At that time this was the largest school in the city, but its capacity would exceed expectations, leading many students to sign in Miloš Crnjanski school as a result.

==== First bus lines ====
On 6 August 1979, the city would introduce the first bus lines to the neighborhood, between the peak hours of 5-8:50 and 12:33-16:18, with departures every 15 minutes. Since then the number of bus lines has increased, along with increased departure dates to accommodate the demands of the growing neighborhood.

==== Health and heating centers ====
In May 1986, the Novo Naselje-Bistrica health center was constructed in the same visual design as the one in Liman IV.

Constructions of the surface heating pipes began in January 1986. They would be a noticeable feature of the neighborhood when entering from its south side from Slobodana Jovanovića Boulevard until they were placed underground sometime in the early 2010s.

==== First church ====
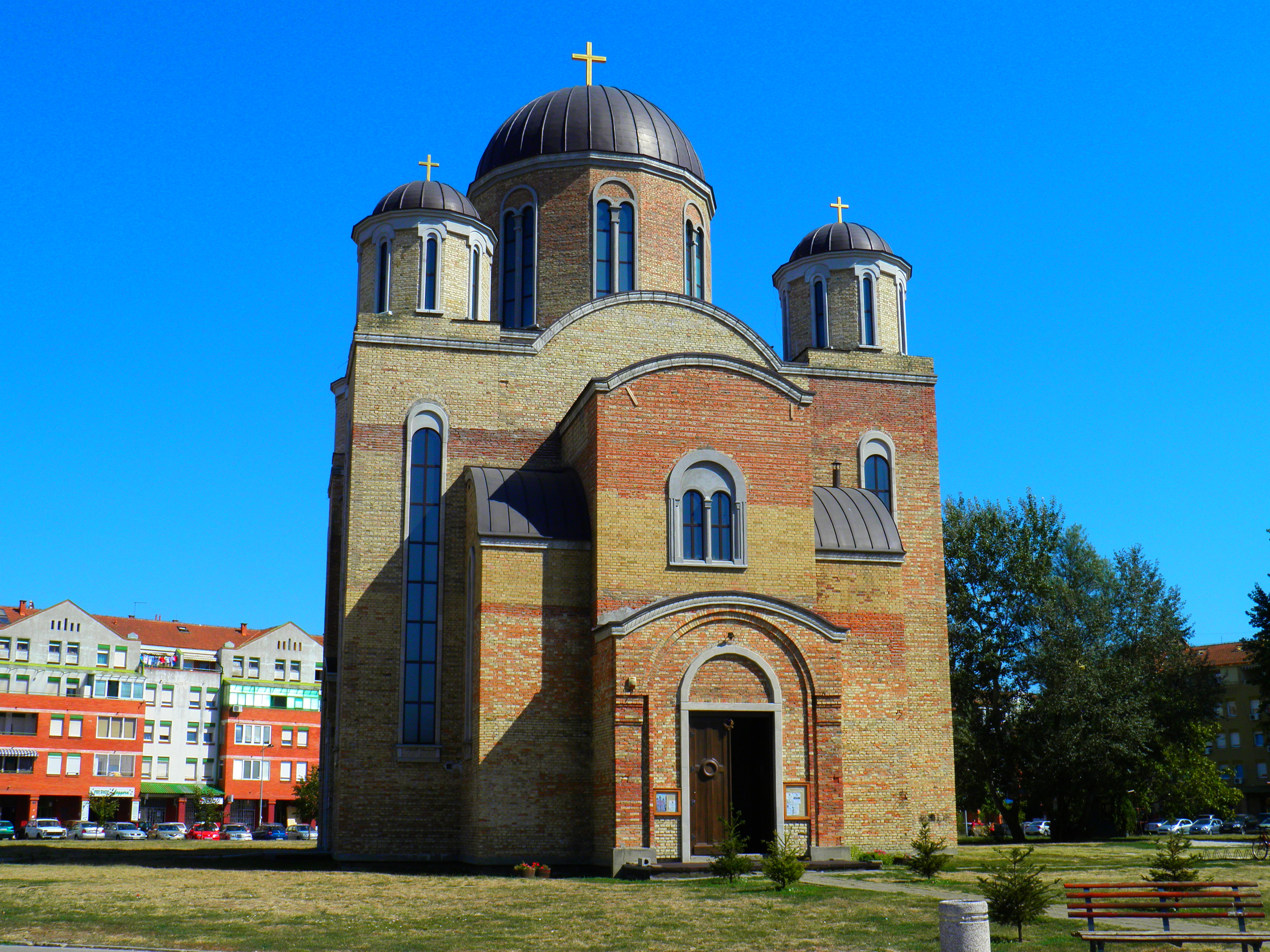
Translation of the relics of Saint Sava orthodox church in Bistrica (under construction), September 2012

During communist rule, there were no plans on building a church in Novo Naselje. However, after the fall of communism and the wars in the 1990s, plans for a church sprung up. Budućnost enterprise would be responsible for placing the foundations for the church of the Translation of the relics of Saint Sava (Serbian: Преноса моштију Светог Саве, Prenosa moštiju Svetog Save) in 1996. The Church is 36 meters long, 25 meters wide, and 36 meters tall. Designed by Vlastimir Matić, it was built in the neo-Byzantine style. Described to be inspired by the Church of Saint Sava in Vračar, Belgrade, with elements of Raška architectural school. The initial funds for the church construction came from local Bistrica residents. Its construction would be gradual, periodically stopping due to lack of funds from donations. The consecration of the church would occur on 28 April 2009, with the construction completed on 8 May 2009. Gradually the outer façade would be covered with white paint, with red paint coloring the window relief patterns, relief lines below the domes, outlines on the towers, and the entrance columns. The outer façade would be fully painted by the end of 2019. In August 2021, the green area and pathways around the church would be tidied up by the end of the year. A small playground would be constructed in its eastern end.

=== Constructions of the 2000s–onward ===
After the economic crisis and sanctions of the 1990s, constructions in Bistrica halted for some time. Between 2000 and 2020, most of Tozinovac was dismantled to make way for the Bate Brkića Boulevard extension, connecting it with Futoška road. Several new apartment buildings were constructed in the southern parts of Bate Brkića. Several road extensions for Jovana Dučića Boulevard were done, connecting the neighborhood with Veternik with Dragoslava Srejovića street.

By the General Urban Plan of Novi Sad for 2030, the remaining empty land areas in Bistrica and its surrounding neighborhoods are planned to be filled with new apartment blocks, public leisure and sports parks, schools, recreational centers, fire and police stations, commercial and business buildings, and cultural centers (museums, galleries, libraries, and other gathering areas for local cultural events). The remained of the houses located in the Satelit Tozinovac area are planned to be demolished to make room for apartment buildings, as well as the reconstruction of the Satelit fresh market and elementary school "Miloš Crnjanski". Most of the western part of Subotica Boulevard (Europe Boulevard) is planned for residential and business buildings. There are plans to reintroduce a tram line through Jovan Dučić and Knez Miloš Boulevards.

Most of the newly planned constructions would shrink the remaining heavily tree covered green spaces around the neighborhood, with parts of the current tree nursery garden marked as a construction zone, as well as shrinking the green spaces next to the Subotica Boulevard (Europe Boulevard). In Jugovićevo, a neighborhood closely linked with Bistrica, an eco-neighborhood is planned with a park-forest, despite the area having low tree cover and historically being a wetland with underground water issues.

== Population ==
According to 1991 census the population of Bistrica numbered 24,595 people, including:

- Serbs (70%)
- Hungarians (10%)
- Montenegrins (5%)
- Slovaks (5%)
- Croats (5%)
- Others (5%)

In 2010, informal Romani settlements were located in the eastern parts of Bistrica neighborhood. Most were displaced or are planned to be displaced, due to the new residential and business buildings planned in that area.

Since 2022, Bistrica (together with Satelit and parts of Jugovićevo) in total has about 36,400 residents registered in their two local communities: Bistrica with 20,715; Gavrilo Princip with 15,693.

== Local Communities ==
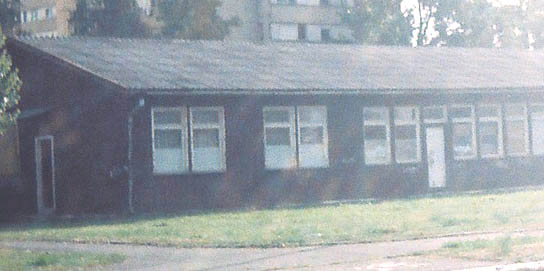
Seat of the Podunavlje municipality from 1980 to 1989, April 2009

Bistrica is part of Novi Sad municipality, and since 1989 it is administratively divided into two local communities:

- Bistrica, located in Braće Dronjak 11, encompasses northwestern parts of the neighborhood and southeastern parts of Jugovićevo neighborhood;
- Gavrilo Princip, located in Jovana Dučića 3, encompasses southeastern parts of the neighborhood, Satelit and Zapadna Privredna Zona.

Between 1980 and 1989, the seat of the Podunavlje municipality, one of the former seven municipalities of Novi Sad City, was located in Novo Naselje.

Until 1989, the local communities situated in Satelit were Gavrilo Princip and Boris Kidrič. After a referendum, Satelit would merge with Novo Naselje, with its two local communities merging into Gavrilo Princip.

== Culture ==
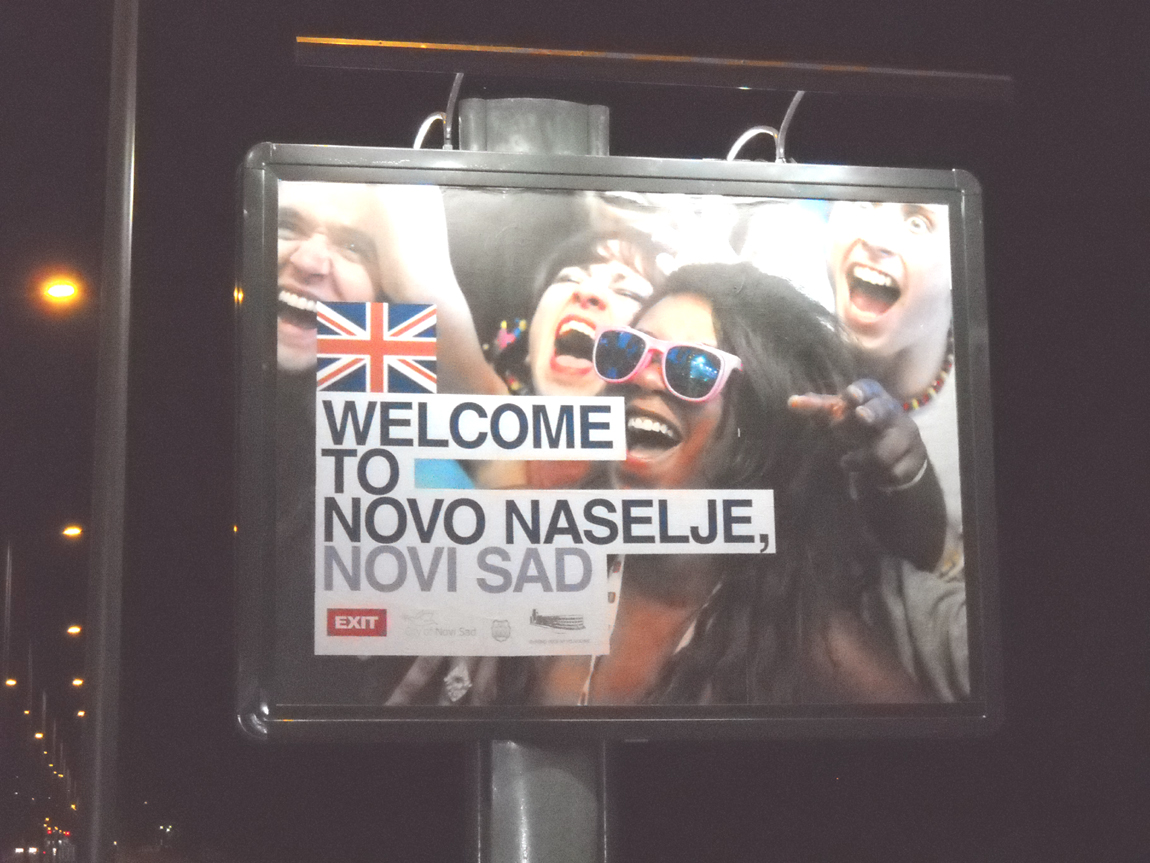
"Welcome to Novo Naselje" sign for the 2010 Exit festival

An offset of the Novi Sad City Library is located in Bistrica.

The orthodox church of the Translation of the relics of Saint Sava, locate at the corner of Jovana Dučića Boulevard and Radomira Raše Radujkovića street, is the religious center for many Bistrica residence, especially during religious holidays such as Christmas Eve. While currently still under construction (church interior and bell tower), the church itself is open for the public and for religious use.

The neighborhood has numerous privately owned bakeries, restaurants, and cafes, showcasing typical Serbian and international food and drinks.

== Economy ==
Bistrica, just as many neighborhoods in Novi Sad, has commercial areas integrated with residential areas such as: small business centers, banks, trade and craft shops, supermarkets, etc. Most Bistrica residence also use the commercial areas at the very edge of Jugovićevo and Telep neighborhoods.

=== Factories ===
There are several factories in the settlement:

- Jugoalat, a factory for production of cutting tools;
- Jugodent, a factory for production of dentist equipment;
- Autokop, a factory for production of idle parts for cars;
- Dunav, a factory for production of orthopedic equipment.

=== Markets ===
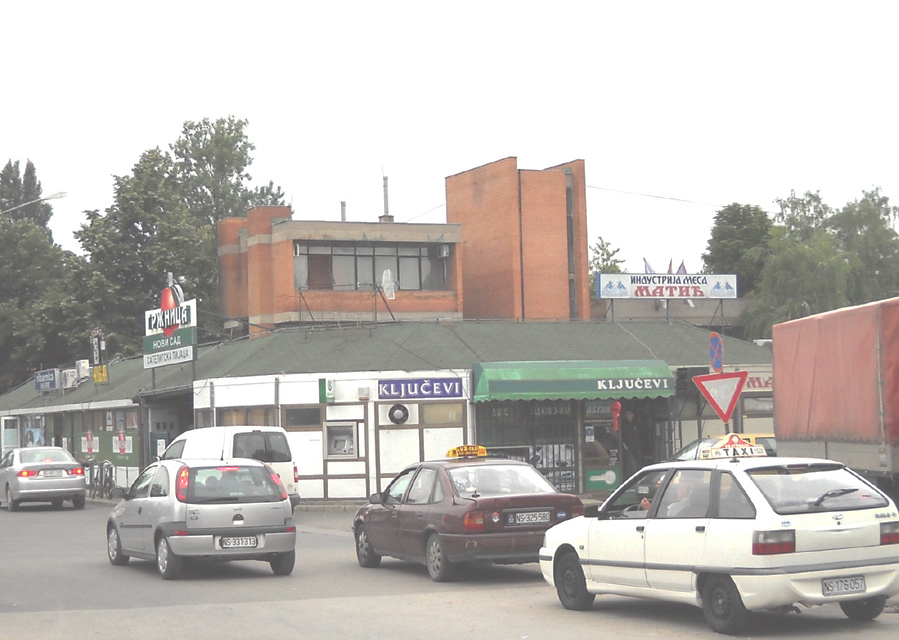
Satelit green market in Bistrica, June 2009

Bistrica has several supermarkets located within or at the very outskirts of the neighborhood (part of other neighborhoods but used by Bistrica residence due to their vicinity):

- Univer-Export (building previously used by Stoteks, C-market, Roda Market, and Mercator),
- Maxi (building previously used by Tempo),
- DIS (building previously used by Jugodent),
- Gomex,
- Lidl,
- Idea (building previously used by Roda Market).

Bistrica also has a green market, "Satelit", and an unofficial flee market, "Buvljak".

=== Transportation ===
Historically, the Novi Sad railway passed at the eastern edges of the neighborhood. With the dismantling of the southern city railway connections (moving the railway station from Liman to Boulevard of Jaše Tomića), most of the railway infrastructure was gradually dismantled over the following decades. The old train yard (built in 1921 from the alleged designs of the Gustave Eiffel bureau) was used by freight trains until 2021, when the last railway rails were dismantled and removed following the opening of the new park. There are currently plans to restore the old train yard and use it as part of a larger central park complex connected with the newly made park via a pedestrian bridge.

In the western part of Bistrica is the seat of Javno Gradsko Saobraćajno Preduzeće (the cities public transportation company). Bus lines 2, 6, 7, 8, 9, 13, 18, 51, 52, 53, 54, 55, and 56 connect this neighborhood with other major city neighborhoods, as well as some surrounding settlements (Adice, Futog, Veternik, and Begeč).

The neighborhood has cycling infrastructure, with larger boulevards and streets having segregated cycling roads from pedestrian pathways. Bike racks are located in front of most major public and commercial buildings. Since 2014 with the "Vratimo Novi Sad Biciklistima" initiative (which started in Novi Sad in 2009), NS bike, a local bike renting service company, has its own bike rack area in Jovana Dučić Boulevard. The renting service is available from the start of the cycling season in April and ends in December.

While taxi companies function throughout the city, there are three taxi ranks in the neighborhood, at Jovana Dučića Boulevard next to Univer-Export supermarket (with 26 taxi parking spaces), Seljačkih buna street at Gerontology Center (with 7 taxi parking spaces), and at Futoška road next to Satelit fresh market (with 8 taxi parking spaces).

Notable Bistrica streets are: Jovana Dučića Boulevard, Slobodana Jovanovića Boulevard, Subotica Boulevard or Europe Boulevard, Vojvode Stepe Boulevard, Kneza Miloša Boulevard, Futoška road, Radomira Raše Radujkovića street, Bate Brkića Boulevard, Somborska ramp, etc.

== Society ==
=== Education ===
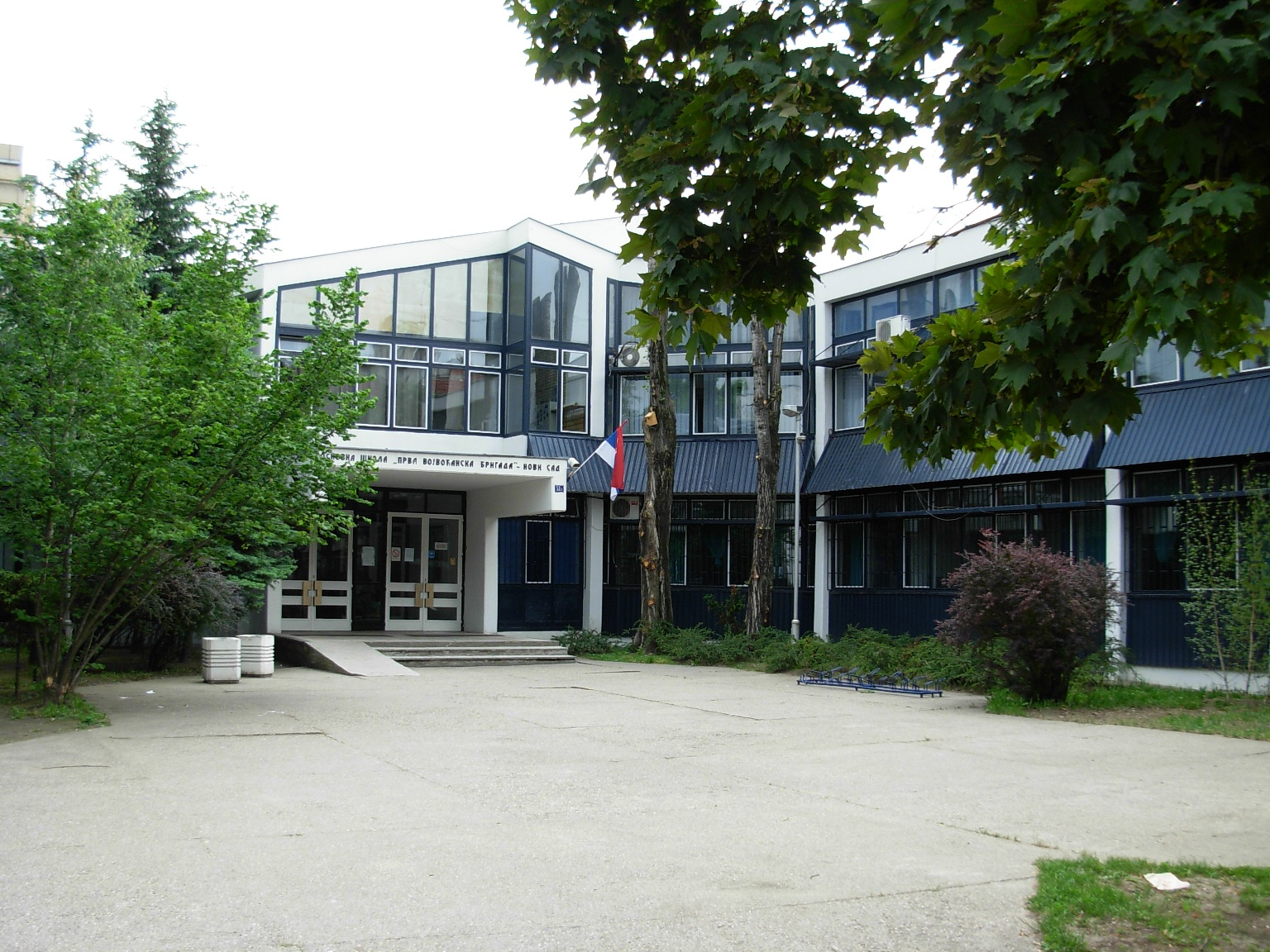
Prva vojvođanska brigada elementary school, May 2011

Bistrica has two primary schools: Prva vojvođanska brigada (built in 1980) and Miloš Crnjanski (built in 1962). It has a school for primary and secondary education "Milan Petrović" (built in 2011).

Bistrica has three kindergartens under the preschool institution of Radosno Detinjstvo: Bajka (built in 1969), Vendi (built in 1980), and Guliver (built in 2008). The neighborhood also has several private kindergartens.

=== Health ===
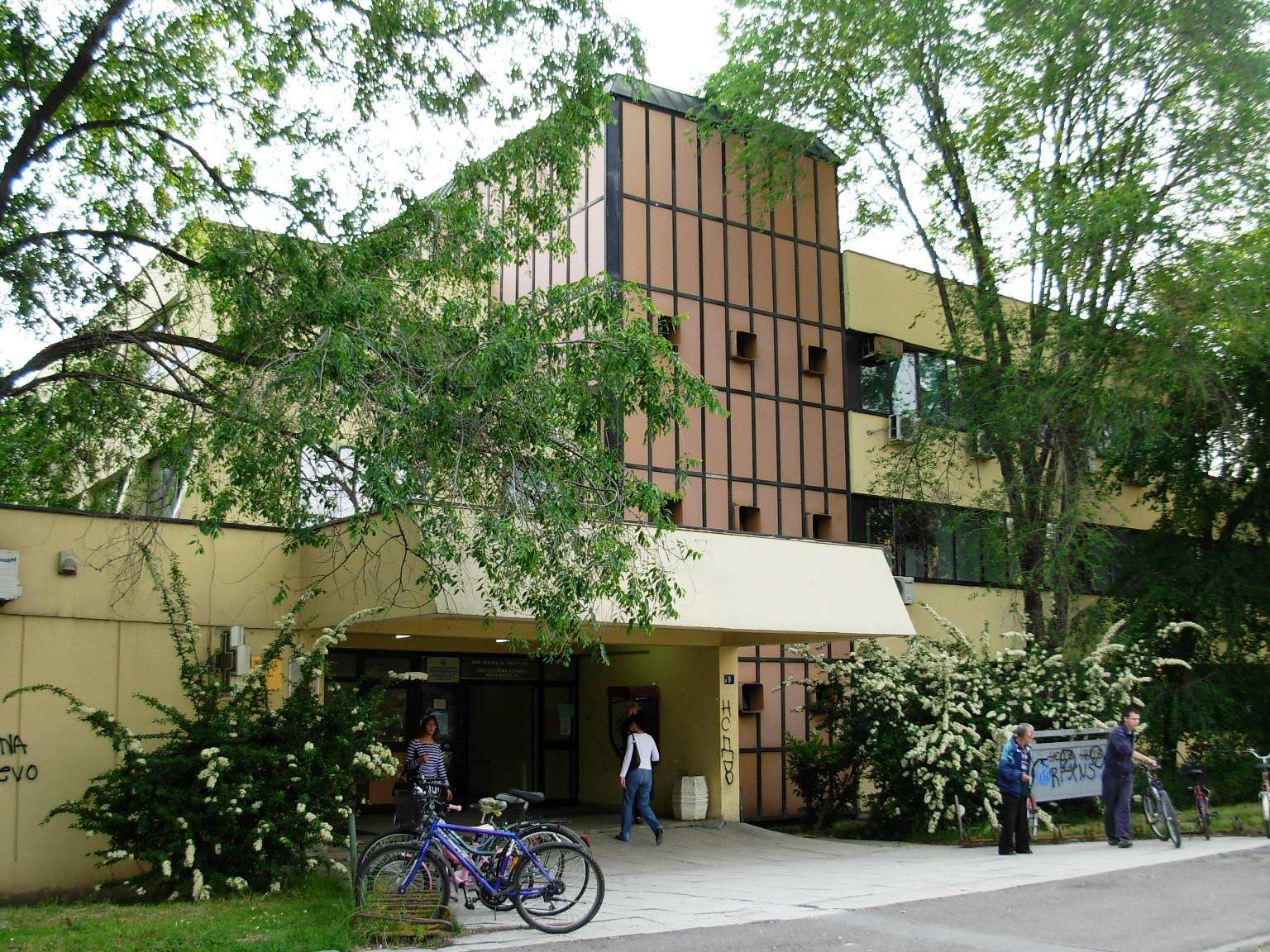
Novo Naselje - Bistrica health center, May 2011

The community health center Novo Naselje - Bistrica is the main health center for the entire neighborhood. During the COVID-19 pandemic, the health center was made as the main respiratory ambulance for the city, as well as the primary location to get vaccine shots for the virus. Most of the community health center staff such as nurses and doctors were reassigned to other health centers around the city during the pandemic, leaving most of the Bistrica residence to go to other health centers around the city where their assigned doctors were for other medical issues.

The neighborhood also has several private medical clinics and dentists (including one veterinarian clinic), as well as one of the larger retirement homes in the city.

=== Sports ===
The Mladost football club and their stadium is located between the Boulevards of Jovana Dučića and Kneza Miloša. Since march of 2022, the club's football stadium and arena were reconstructed after six months of construction work, with renovated club building and the seating areas renovated and expanded, being able to seat 1.400 spectators and host larger football matches.

=== Recreation ===
The neighborhood also has several private tennis schools, as well as private and public gyms.

While Bistrica has numerous public green spaces between buildings due to the urban planning of the 1970s and 1980s, the neighborhood also has several parks. Parks such as Bistrica and Igralište are existing green spaces (originally locations of several atomic shelters for surrounding building residence) repurposed into parks, while the new narrow park (built in 2021) in Radomira Raše Radujkoviča street is a park built from mostly unused city land. The neighborhood also has several dog parks.

Originally, a sports center and a local swimming pool were planned at the corner of the Boulevards of Jovana Dučića and Bate Brkića, but the construction was halted since 2006 with no clear indication of when it would continue. Currently its location is used for the "Buvljak" flee market (previously located in the area what is now the southern end of the Bate Brkića Boulevard).

== Gallery ==
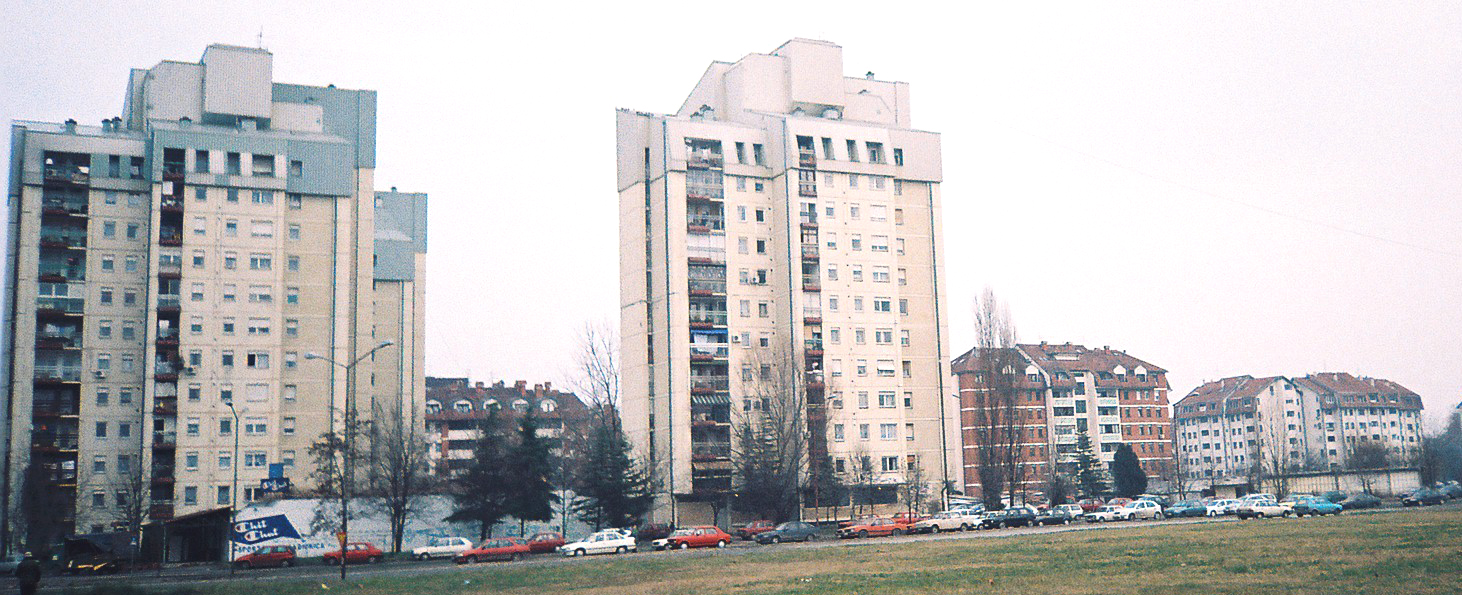
Bistrica, Bate Brkića Street, January 2006

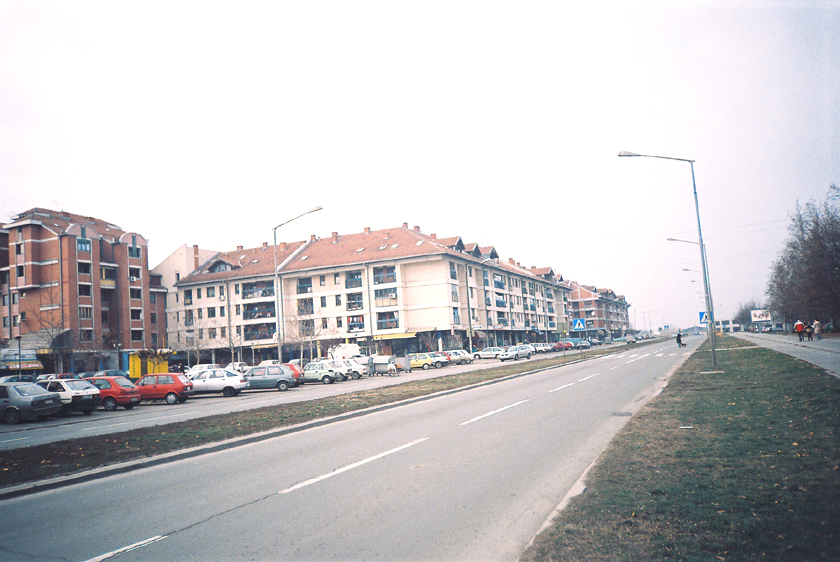
Bistrica, Šarengrad, Knez Miloš Boulevard, January 2006

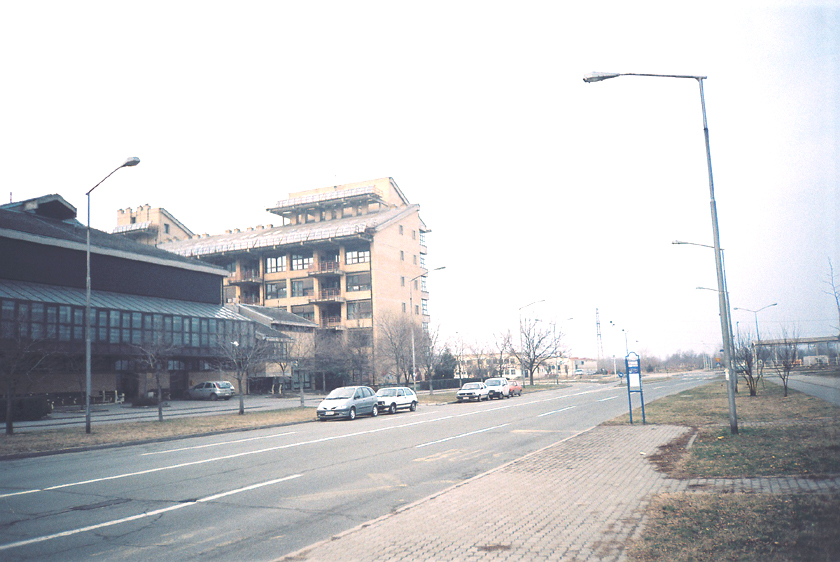
Bistrica, Gerontology Center, Bate Brkića Street, January 2006

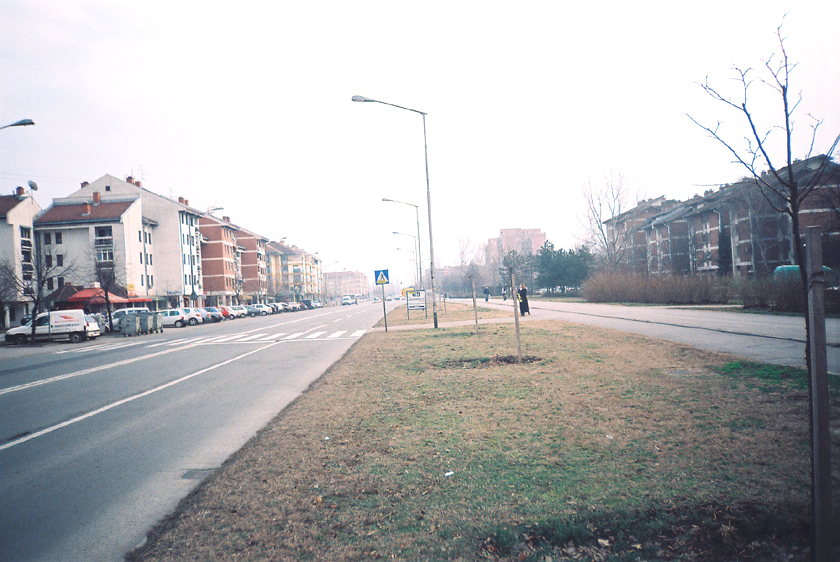
Bistrica, Tozin Sokak, Slobodana Jovanovića Boulevard, January 2006

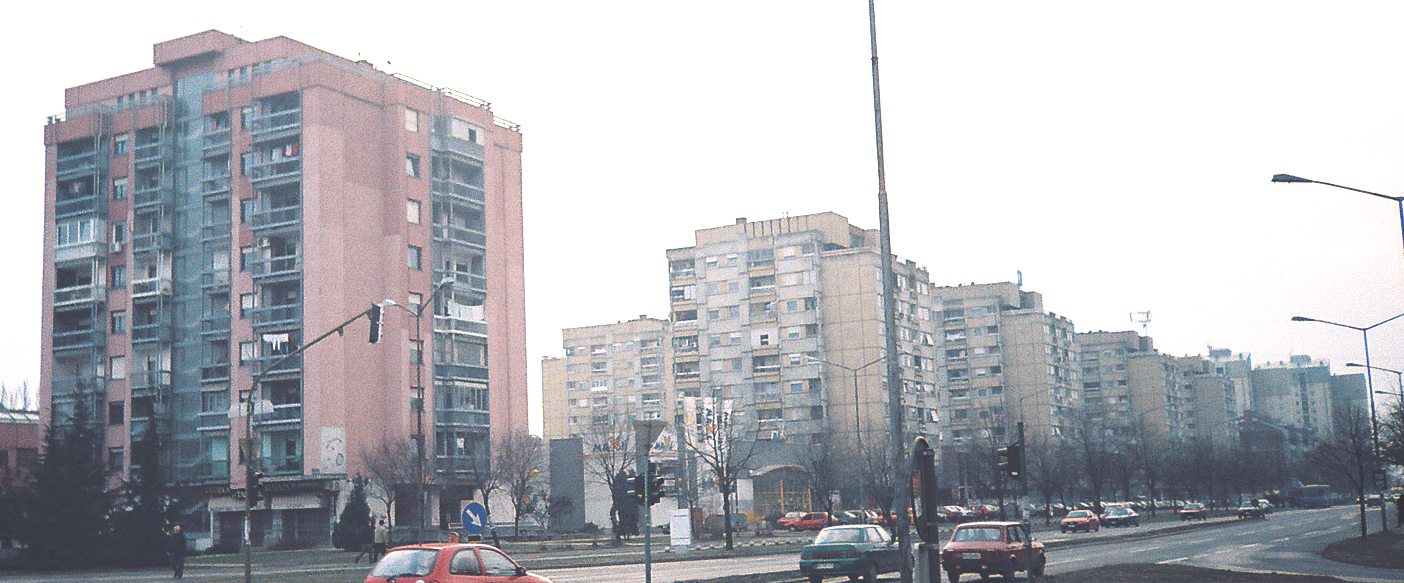
Bistrica, Jovana Dučića Boulevard, April 2009

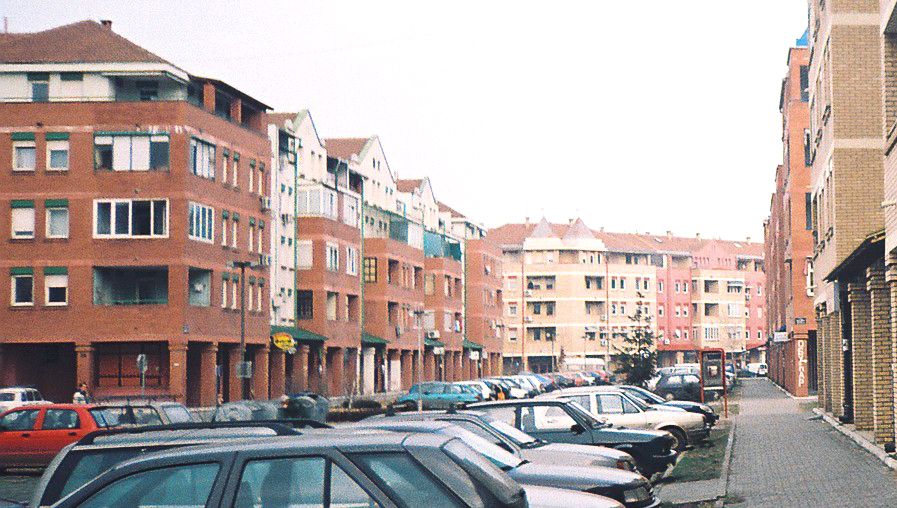
Bistrica, Savina, Vladike Ćirića Street, January 2006

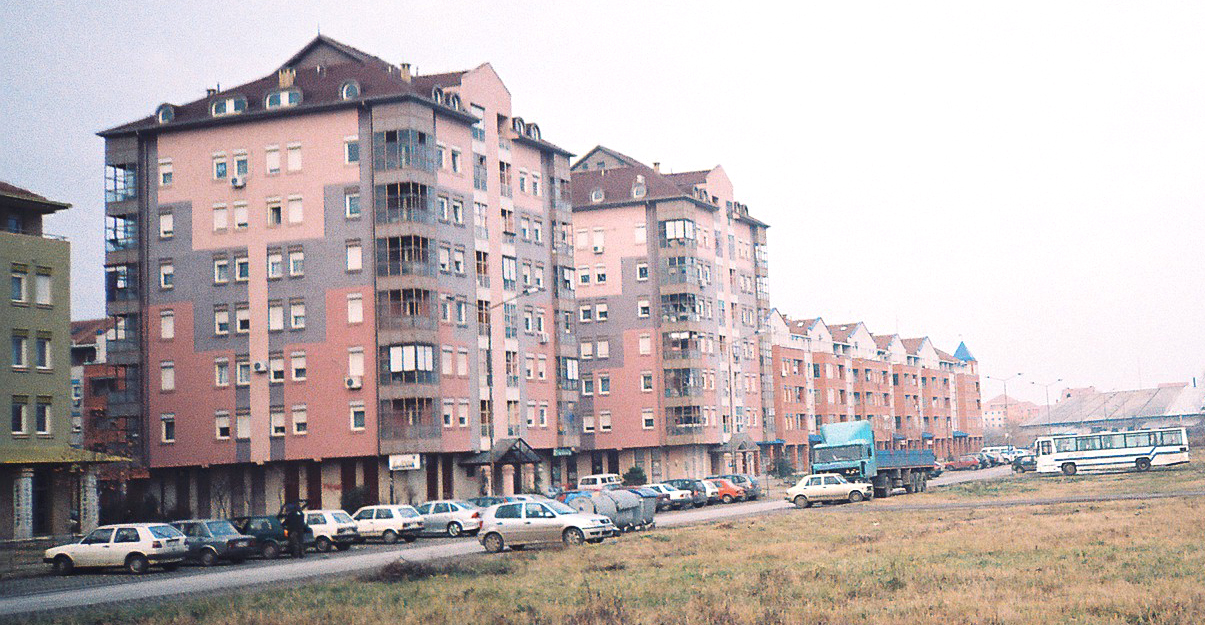
Bistrica, Savina, Branislava Borote Street, April 2009

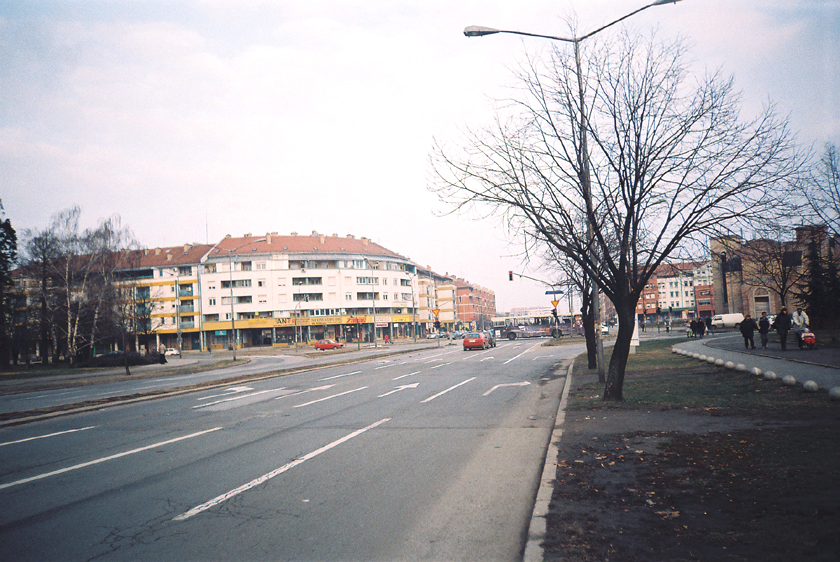
Bistrica, Jovan Dučić Boulevard, April 2009

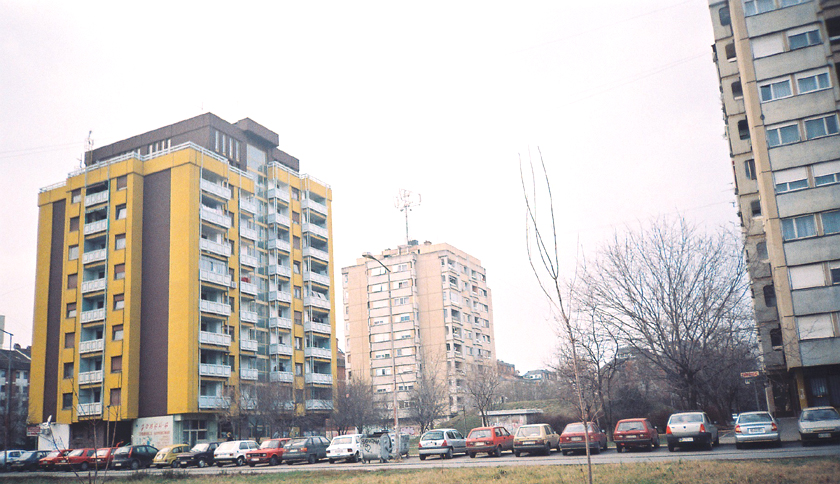
Bistrica, Partizanskih baza Street, April 2009

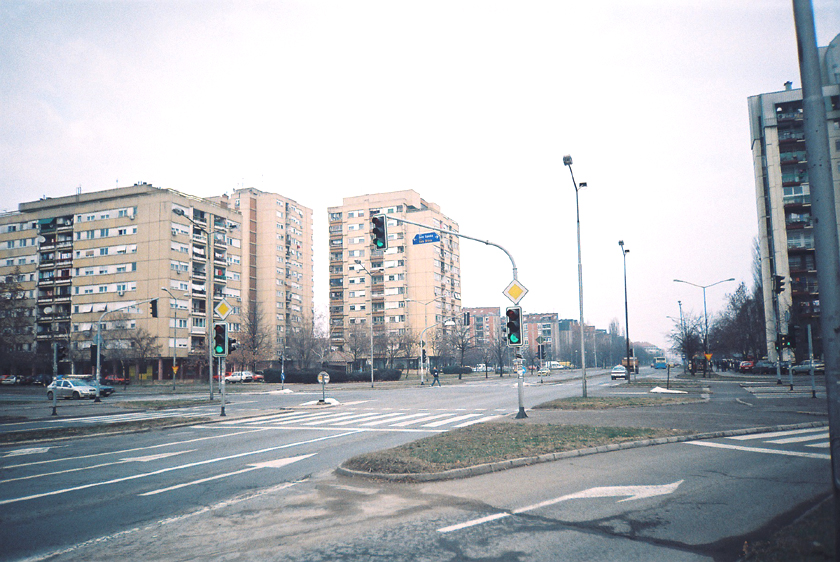
Bistrica, Jovana Dučića Boulevard, March 2006

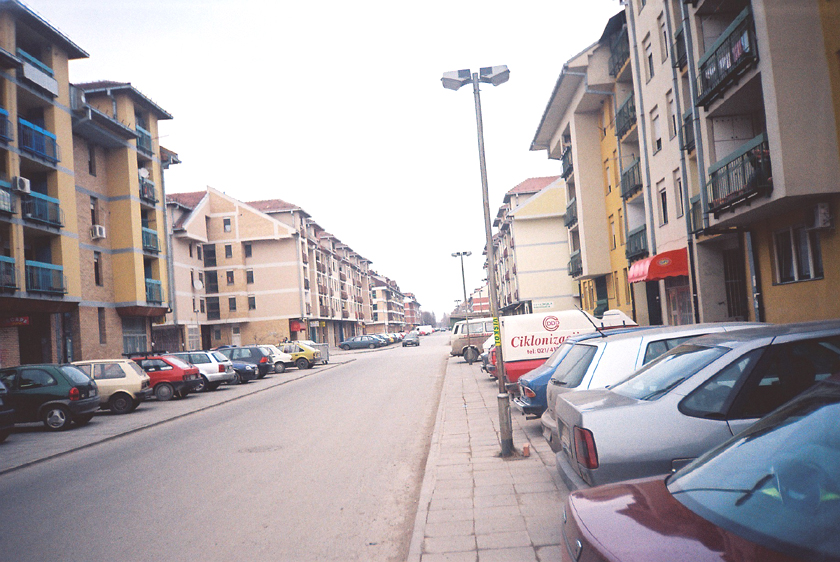
Bistrica, Šarengrad, Mileve Marić Street, April 2006

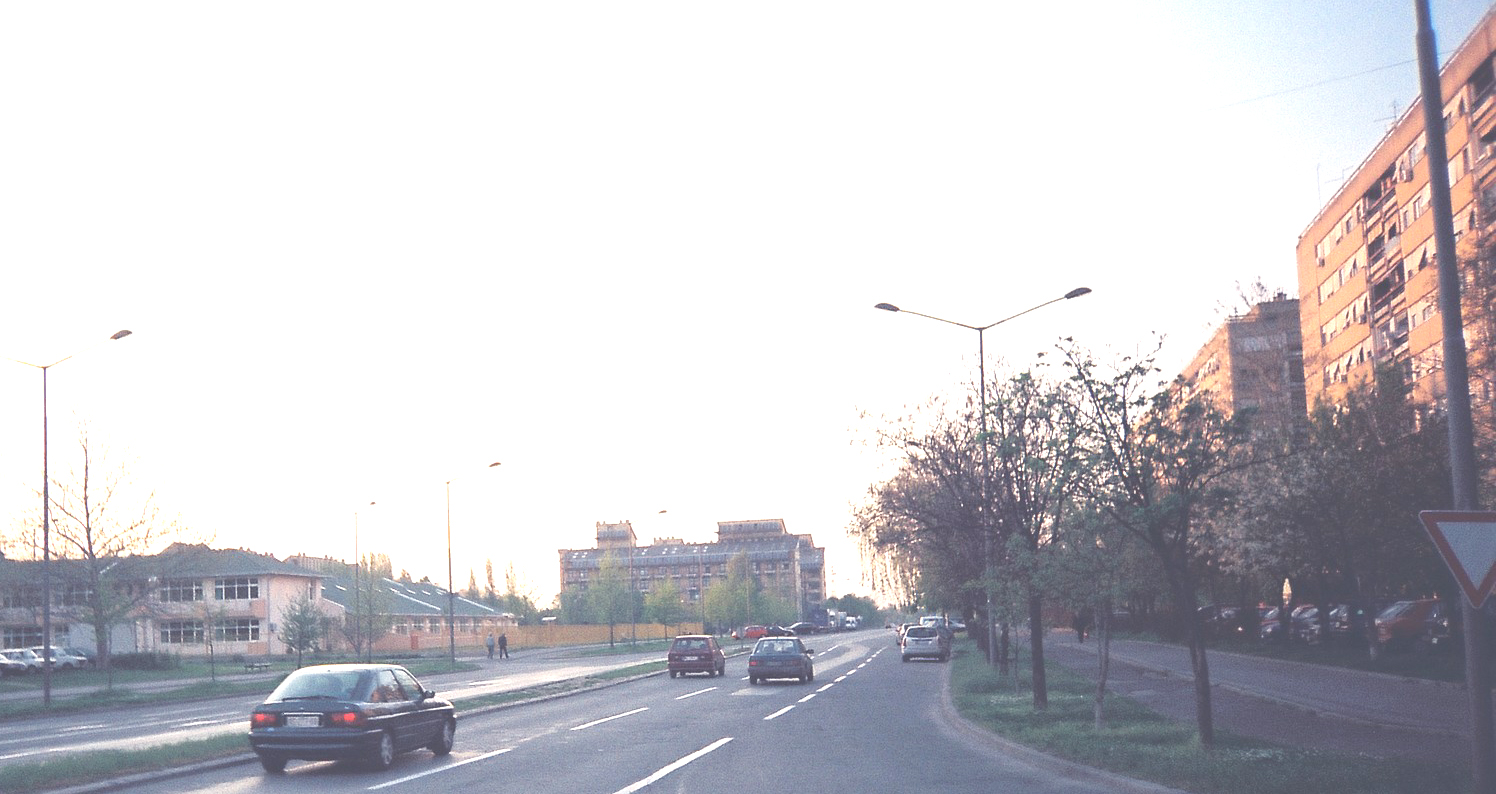
Bistrica, Gerontology Center, Bate Brkića Street, April 2009

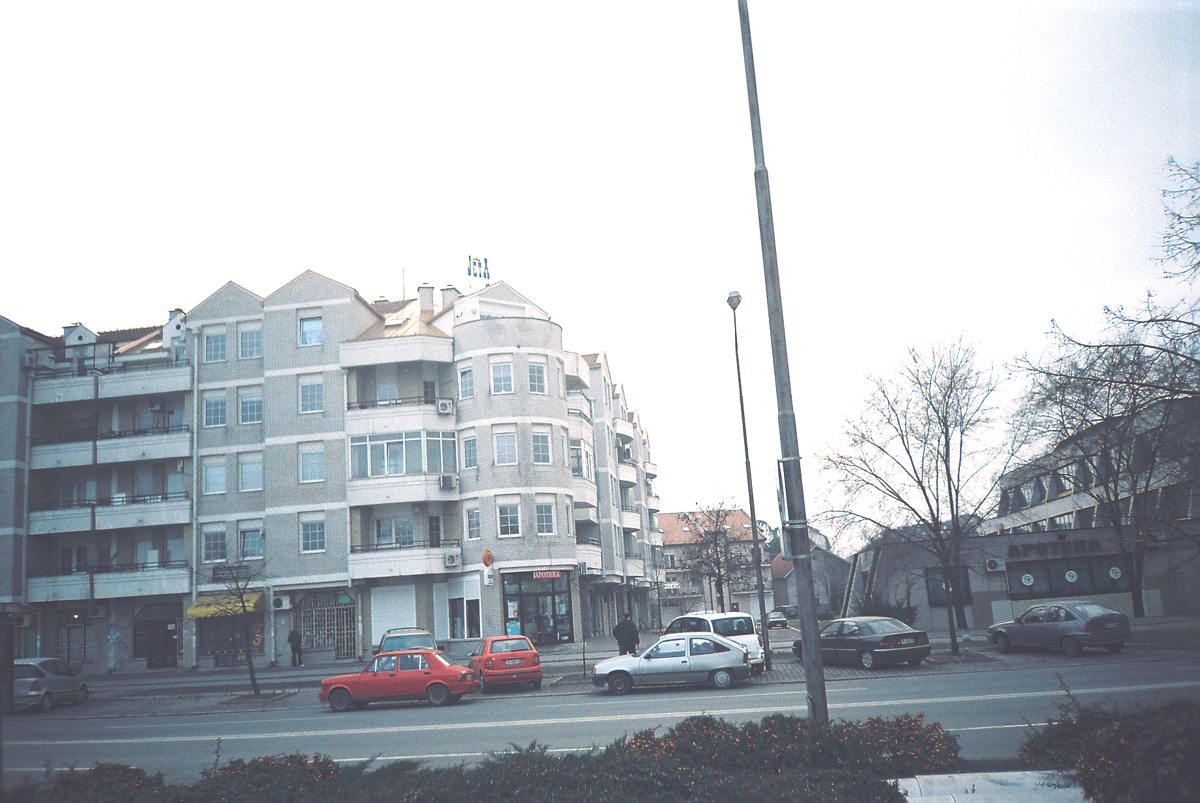
Bistrica, Health Center, Slobodana Jovanovića Boulevard, April 2009

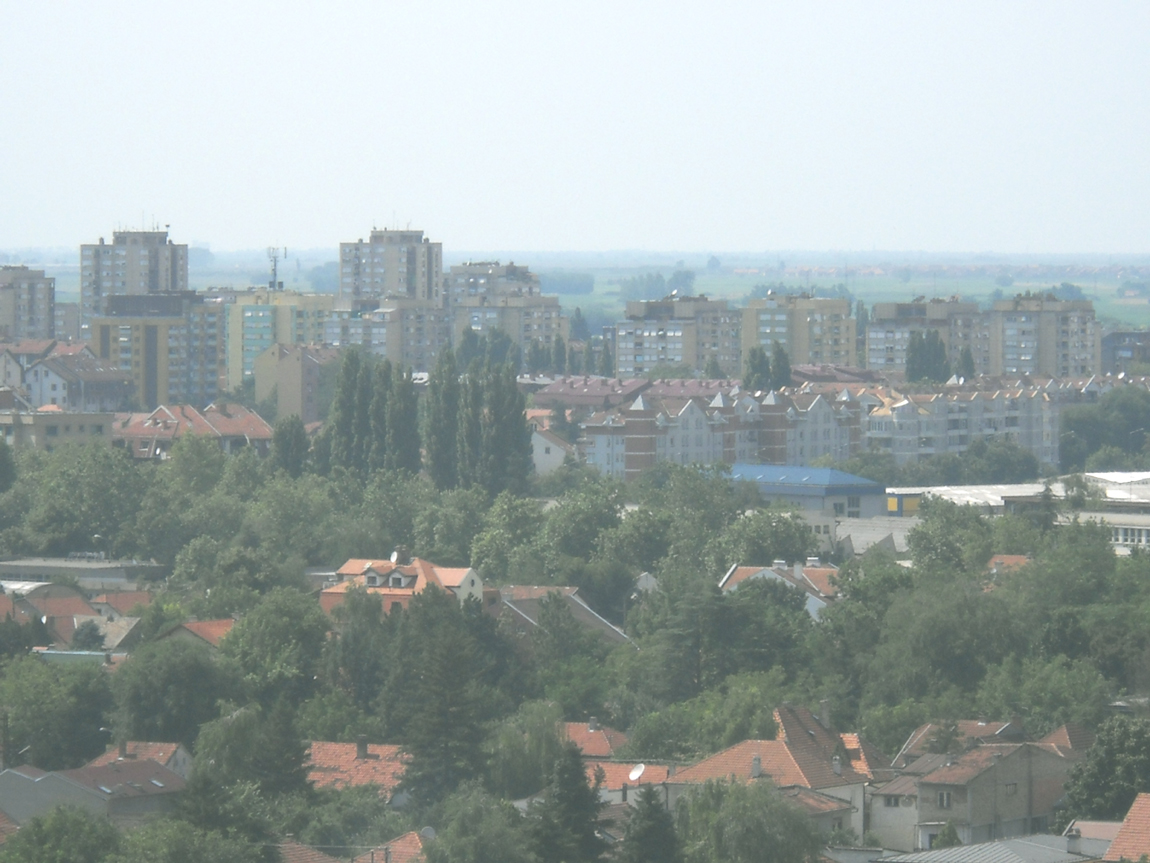
Panoramic view of Bistrica, July 2009

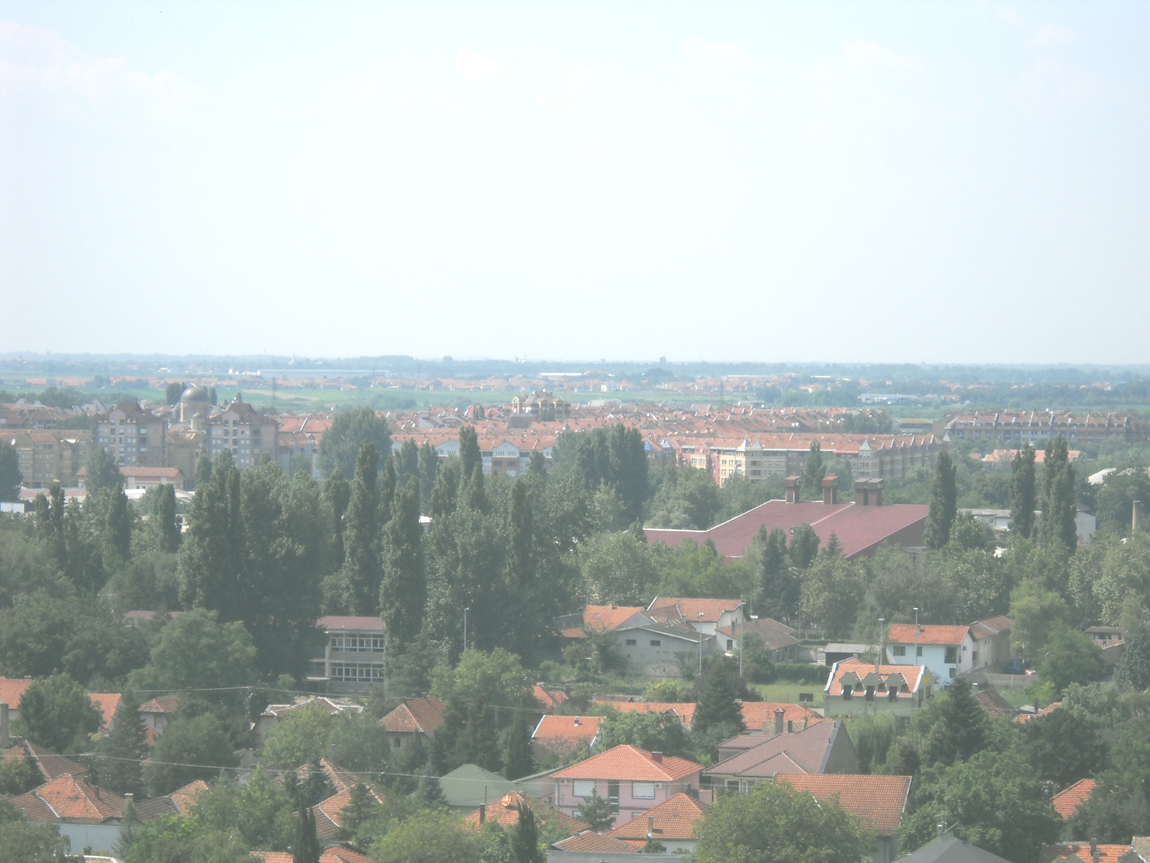
Panoramic view of Bistrica, July 2009

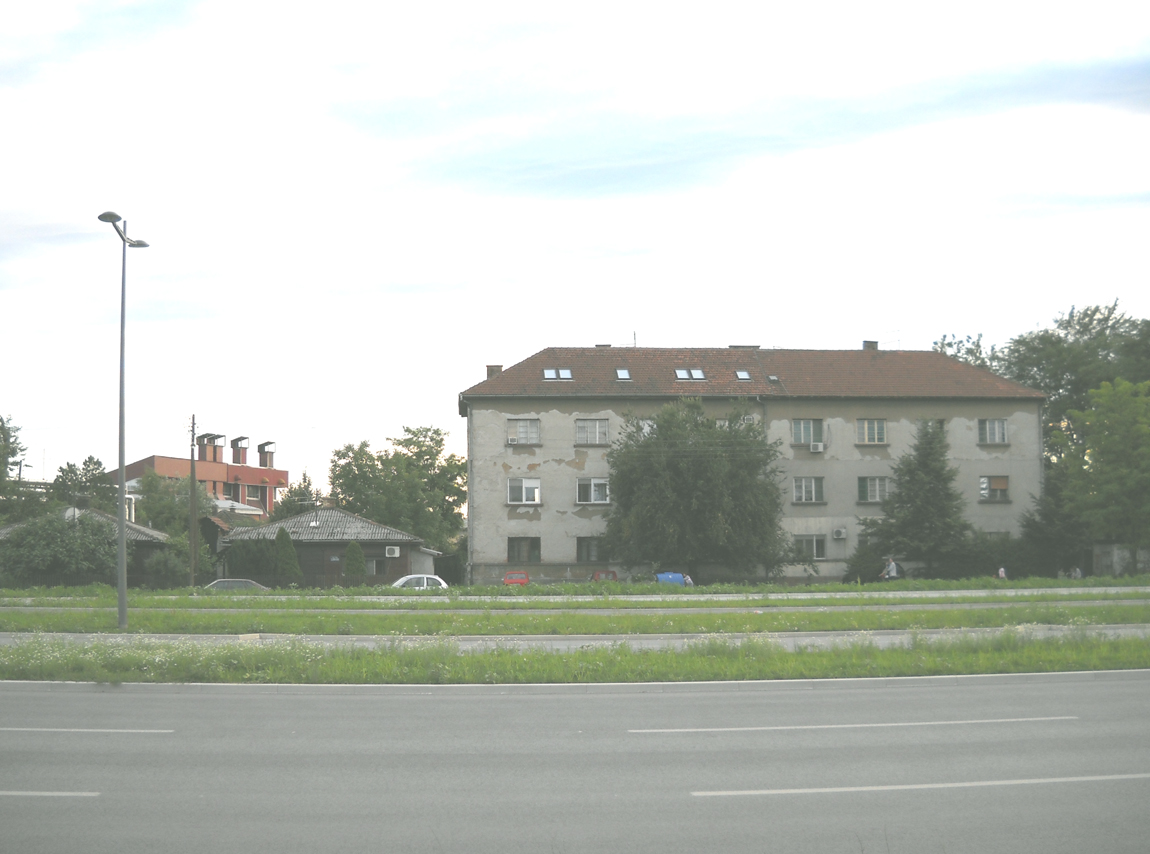
Bistrica, Subotica Boulevard (Evropa Boulevard), June 2009

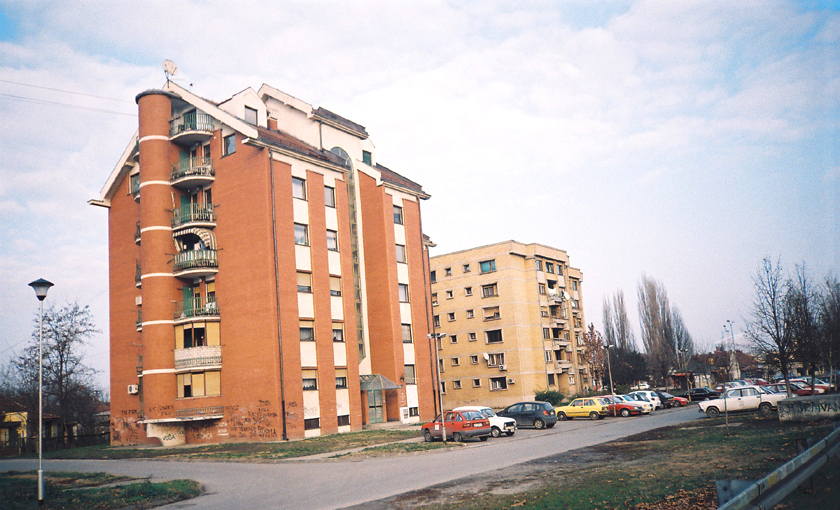
Bistrica, Satelit, Futog Road, April 2009

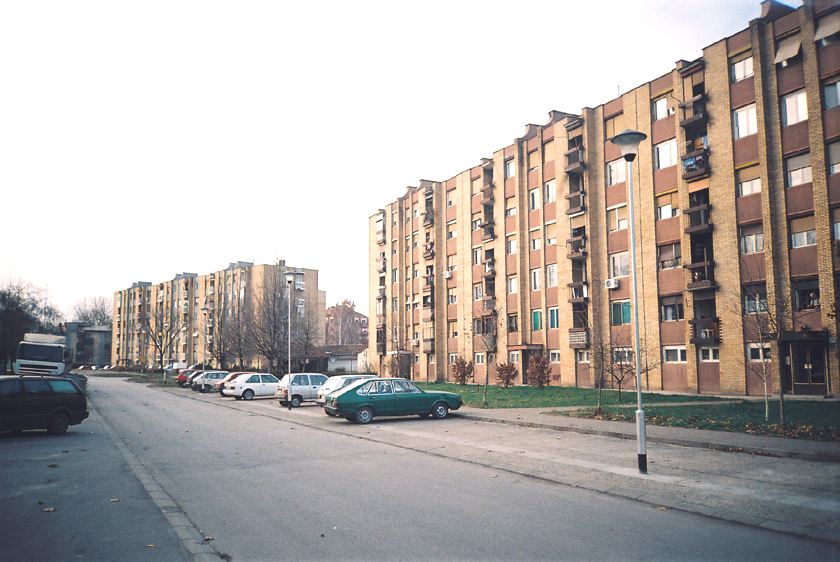
Bistrica, Satelit, Futog Road, April 2009

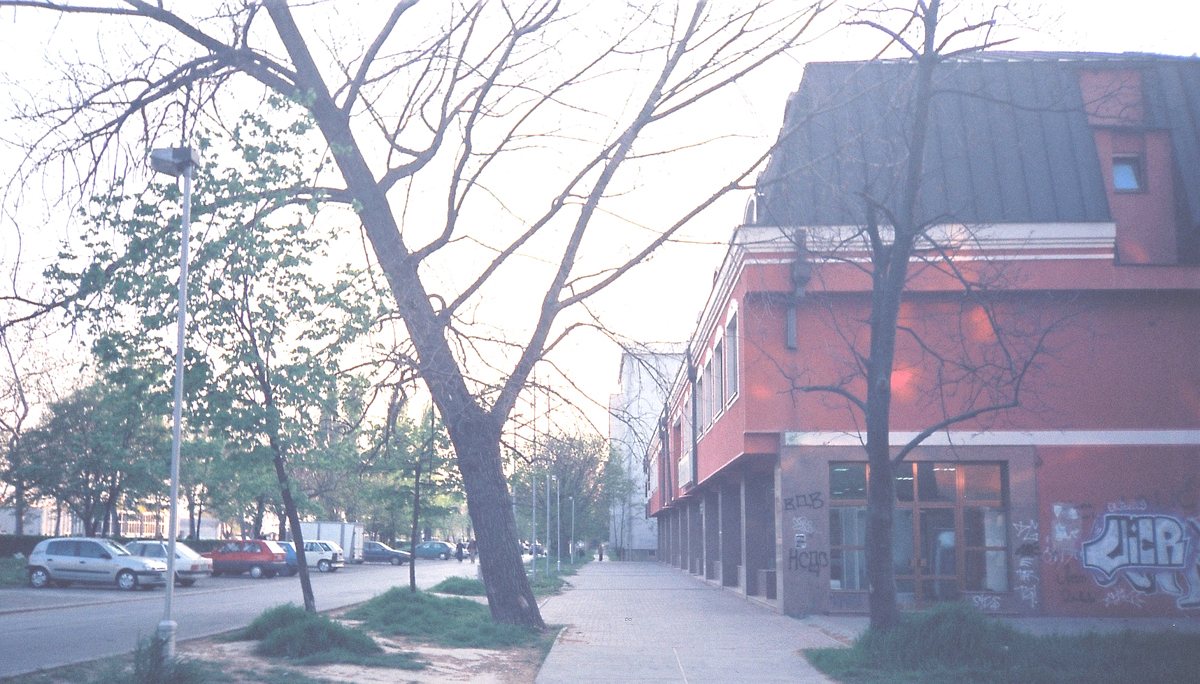
Bistrica, Satelit, Futog Road, April 2009

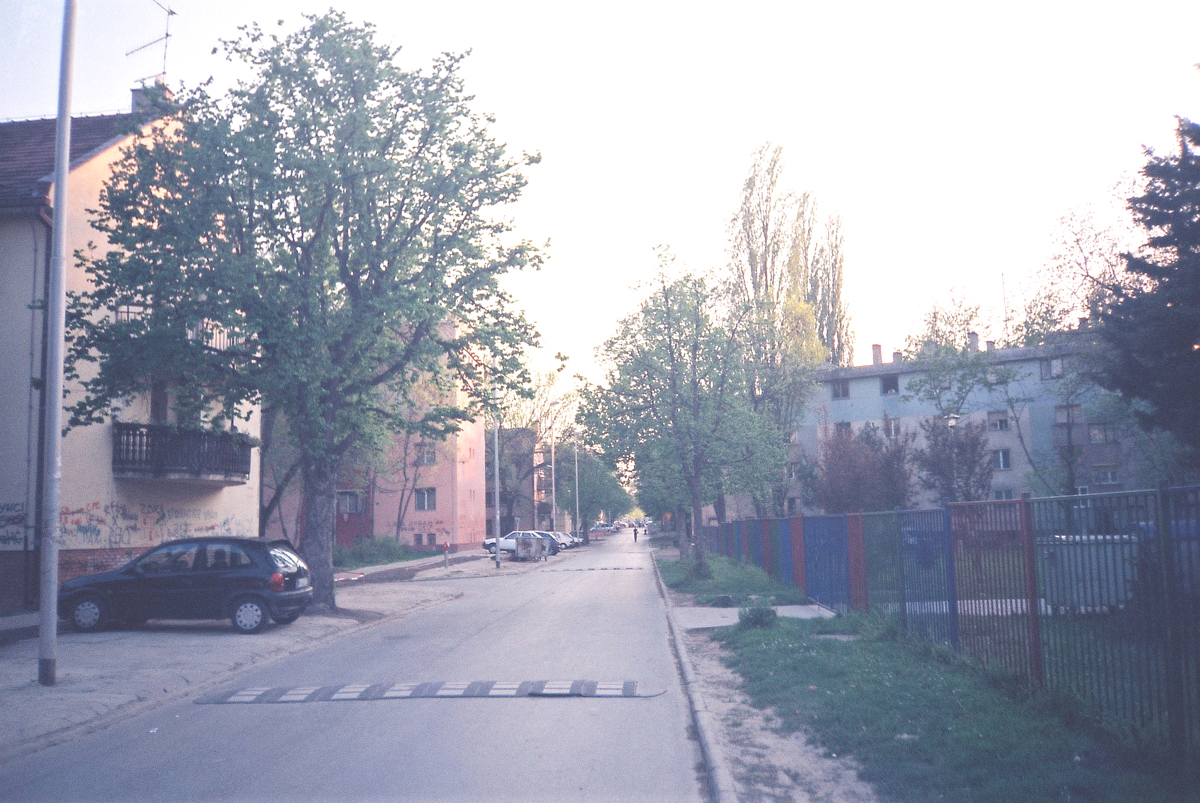
Bistrica, Satelit, Antuna Urbana Street, April 2009

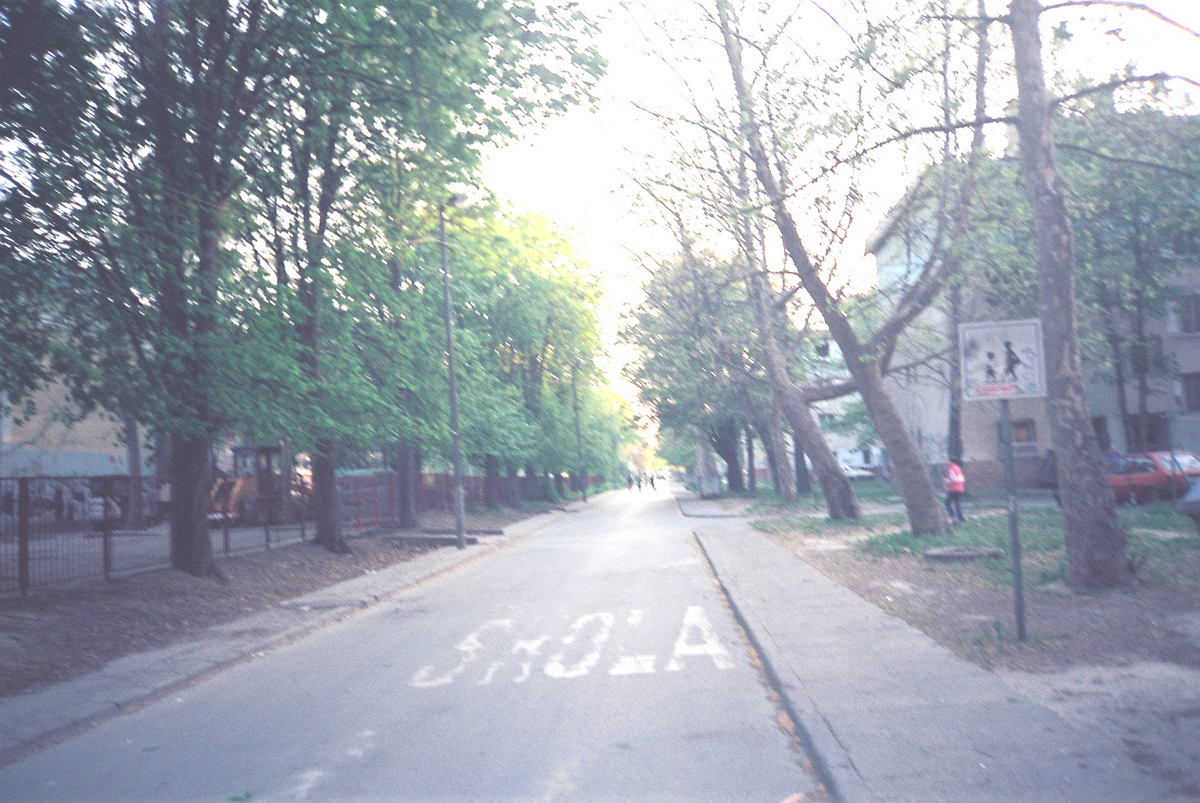
Bistrica, Satelit, Stevana Momčilovića Street, April 2009

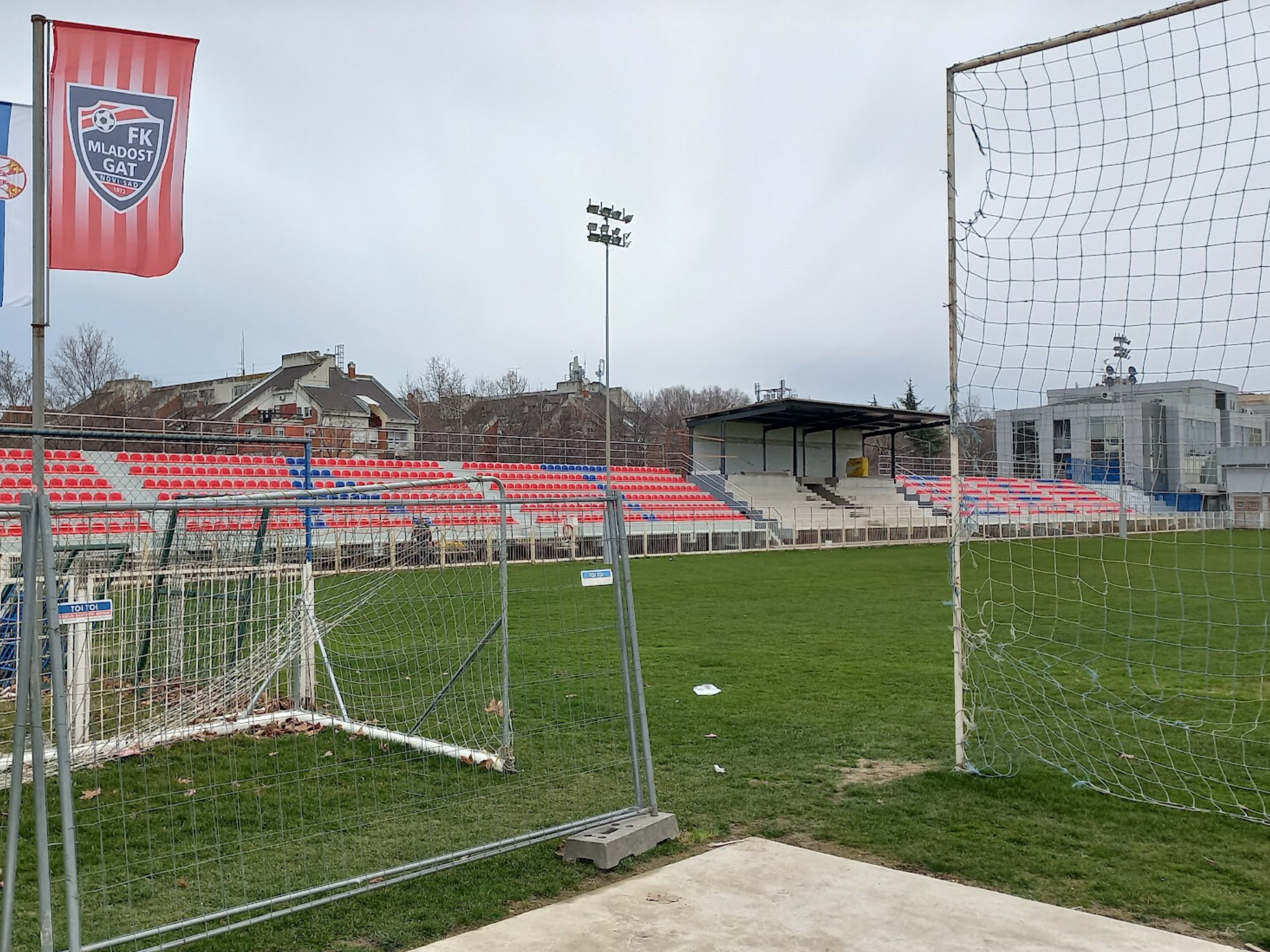
Bistrica, Satelit, GAT Arena of FK Mladost GAT, July 2022

== See also ==
- Neighborhoods of Novi Sad
- Satelit
- Jugovićevo
- Detelinara
- Telep
- Sajmište
