= Veternik =

Veternik Ветерник (Serbian)
- Suburban settlement
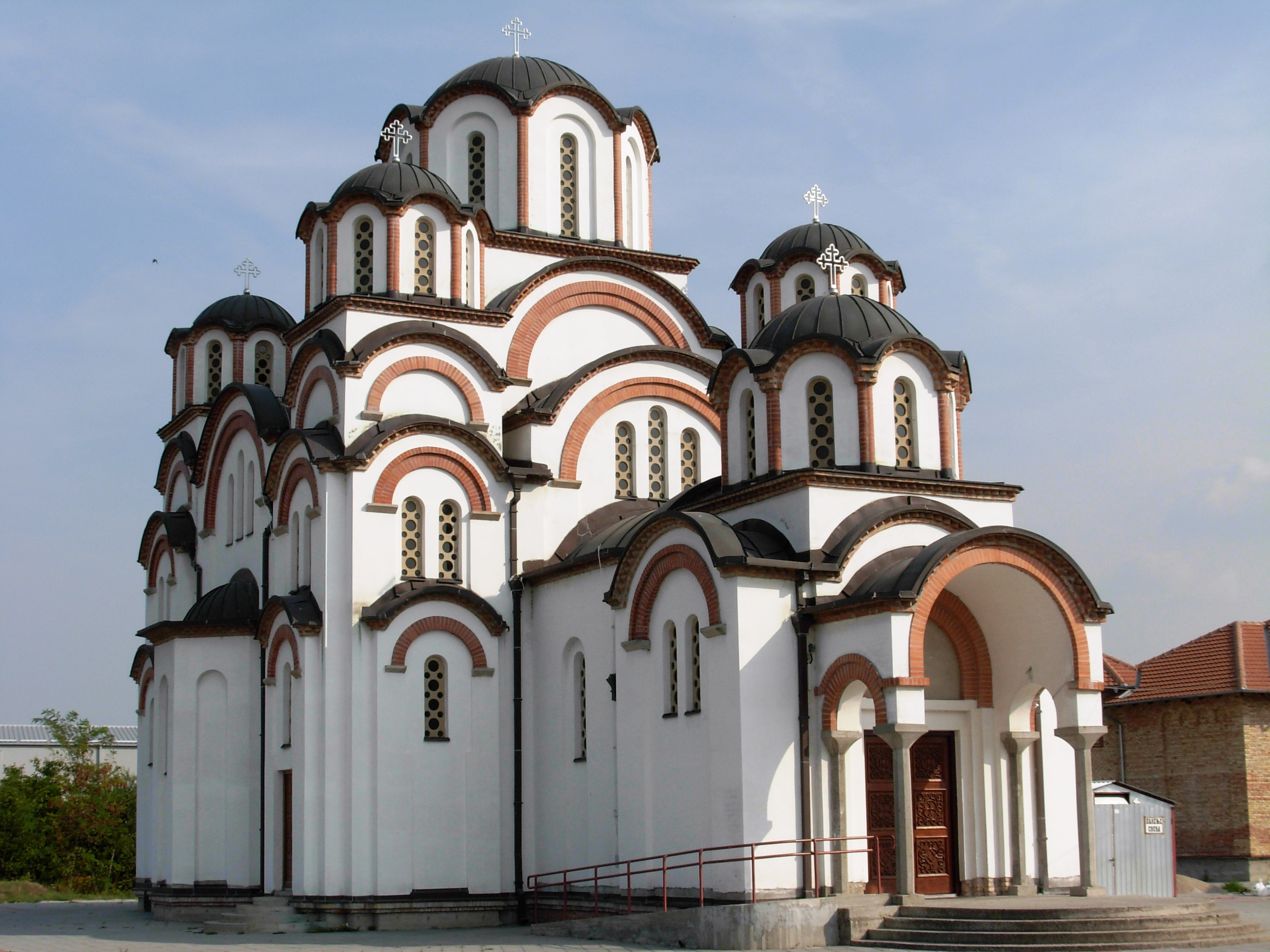
- Orthodox church in Veternik

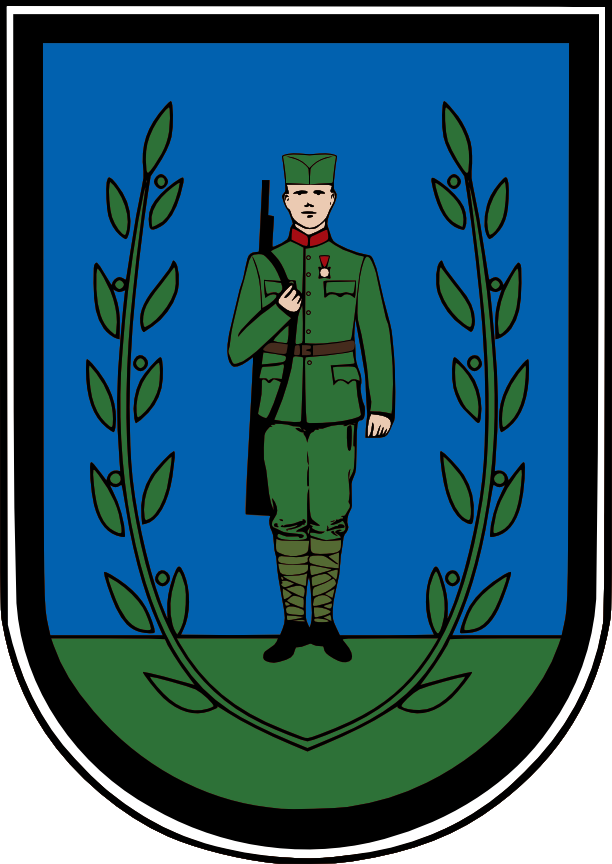
- Coat of arms

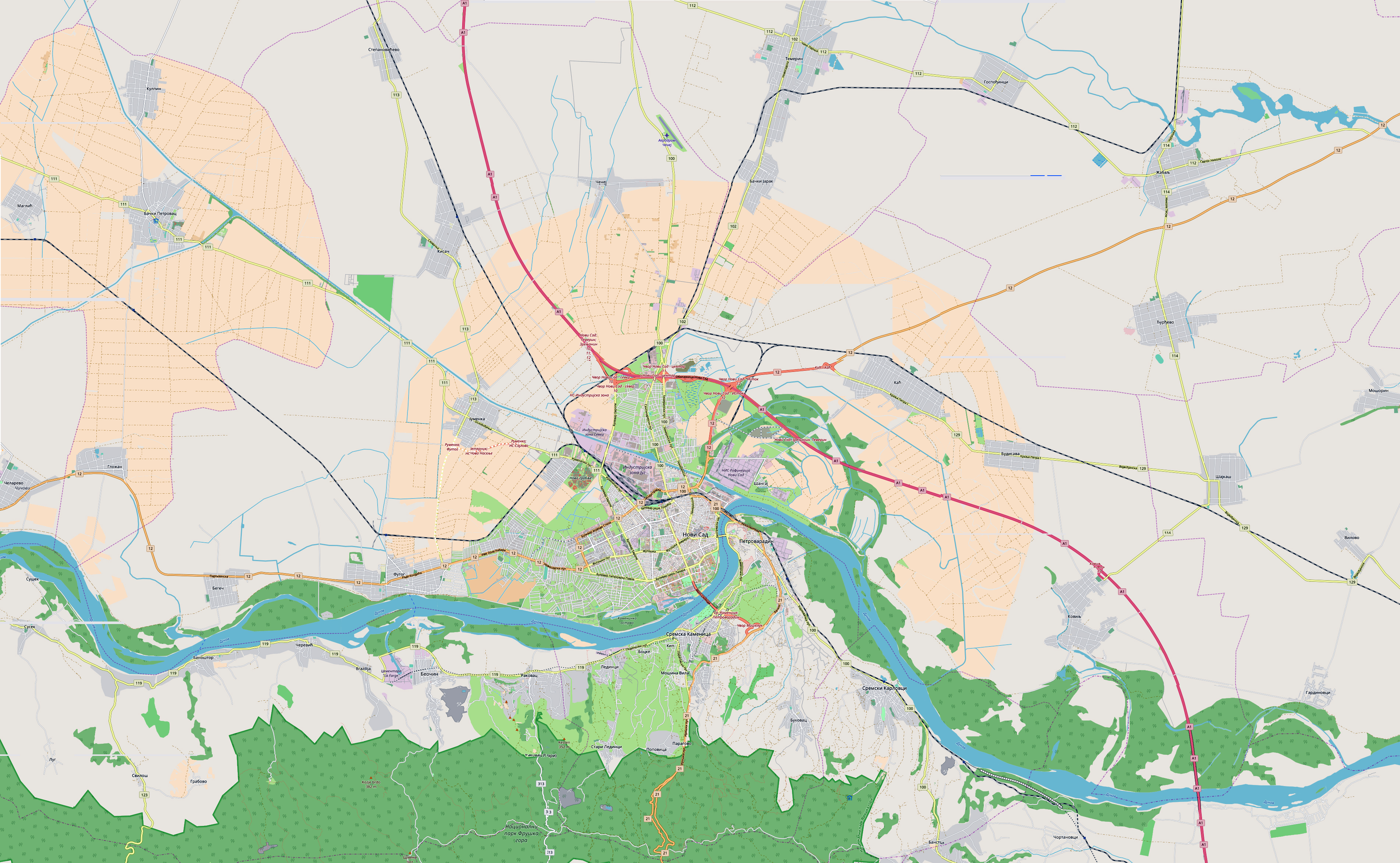
- Location within Novi Sad Veternik (Vojvodina) Veternik (Serbia)
- Coordinates: 45°15′12″N 19°45′39″E
- Country: Serbia
- Province: Vojvodina
- District: South Bačka
- Municipality: Novi Sad

Area
  - Total: 15.37 km^{2} (5.93 sq mi)

Population (2022)
  - Total: 18,849
  - Density: 1,226/km^{2} (3,176/sq mi)
- Time zone: UTC+1 (CET)
  - Summer (DST): UTC+2 (CEST)
- Postal code: 21203
- Area code: +381(0)21
- Car plates: NS

Veternik (Serbian Cyrillic: Ветерник) is a suburban settlement of the city of Novi Sad, Serbia. Over the years, especially in the 1990s, it grew with size and inhabitants thus merging with Futog to the west and Novi Sad to the east.

== Name ==
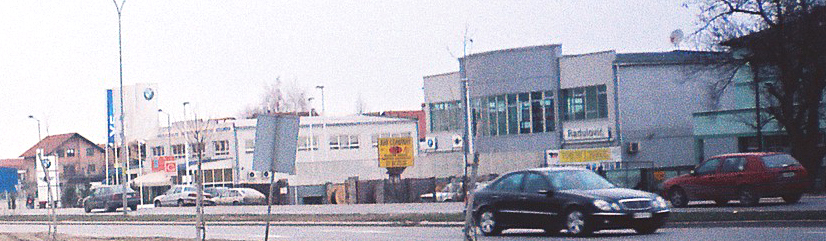
Main road in Veternik (Novi Sad-Futog-Bačka Palanka)

The settlement was named in honour of the assault of the Serbian army in the Veternik mountain area during the breach of the Macedonian front in World War I. It was first called Novi Veternik ("New Veternik"), but was later changed into Veternik. The name Veternik itself means "windy" in Serbian.

In Serbian Cyrillic, the settlement is known as Ветерник (in Serbian Latin as Veternik) and in Hungarian as Hadikliget.

== History ==
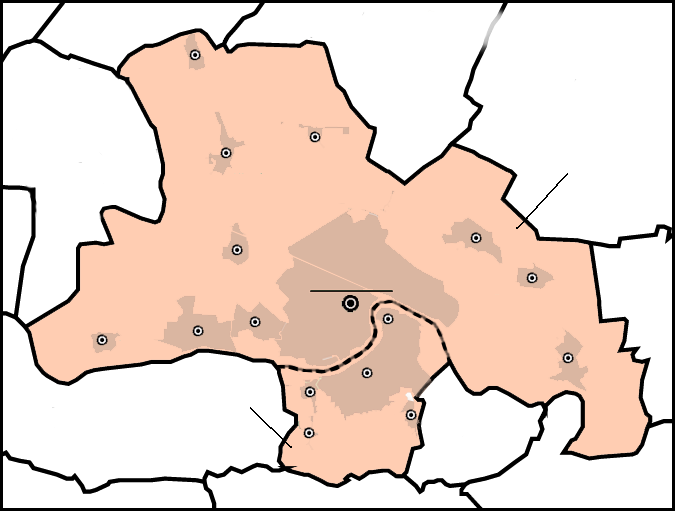

The first settlement at this location was mentioned in 1848 and its name was Neu Ilof. It was a settlement for workers that worked in the nearby estate whose last owner was count Kotek.

The modern settlement was founded in 1918 as a settlement for Serb veterans from World War I. During World War II, the Hungarian occupational authorities relegated the population of the village across the Danube, and settled Hungarians from Bukovina into their houses. After the war, the population returned and settlement largely developed in the next period: from only 789 inhabitants that were recorded by the 1948 census, the population of Veternik rose to 18,626 in 2002.

== Demographics ==
Historical population
Year	Pop.	±%
1948	789	—
1953	846	+7.2%
1961	1,908	+125.5%
1971	5,730	+200.3%
1981	9,556	+66.8%
1991	10,271	+7.5%
2002	18,626	+81.3%
2011	17,454	−6.3%
2022	18,849	+8.0%
Source: Census

== Status ==
Officially, Veternik holds suburban settlement status, as it is part of the agglomeration of Novi Sad. Today, Veternik has merged with Novi Sad completely.

== Features ==
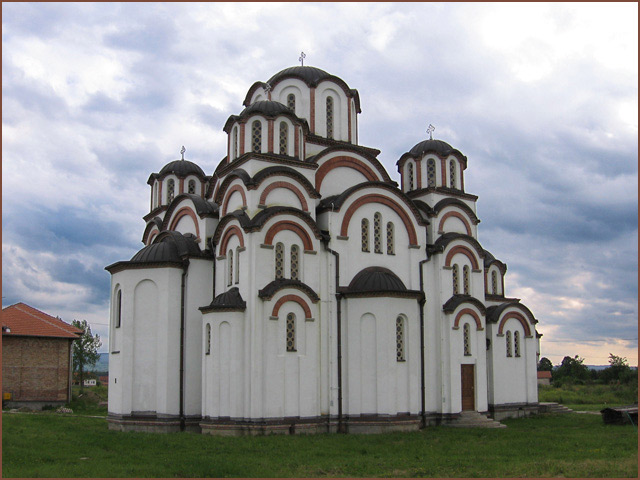
Serbian Orthodox church

Besides basic village infrastructure (post office, two elementary schools, infirmary, library, market etc.), Veternik is also home to an institution for handicapped children and young people.

In 2009 the city of Nova Sad decided to build a new primary school in Veternik with access for children with disabilities. The new school was named after the local philanthropist Marija Trandafil.

== See also ==
- List of places in Serbia
- List of cities, towns and villages in Vojvodina
