= Education in Novi Sad =

Novi Sad is one of the most important Serbian centers of higher education and research, with four universities, numerous professional, technical, and private colleges, and a couple of research institutes.

== Primary schools ==
=== Public primary schools ===
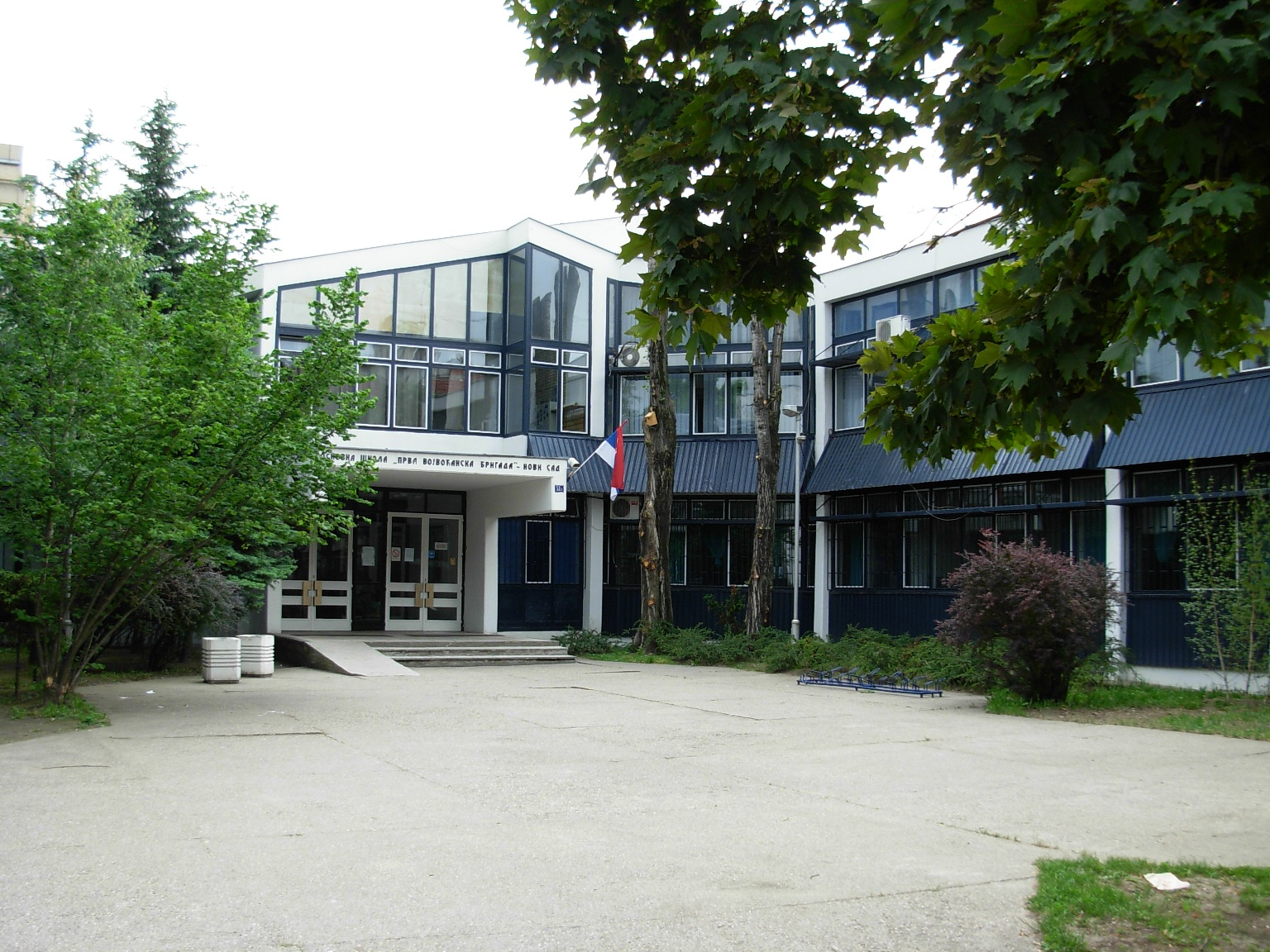
Prva vojvođanska brigada primary school, Novi Sad

The municipality of Novi Sad has 37 schools (34 regular and 3 special ones) operating as primary schools. As many as 22 schools are located on the territory of the City of Novi Sad. In addition to Novi Sad, primary schools in this municipality are also located in places like: Bukovac, Stepanovićevo, Futog, Budisava, Petrovaradin, Sremska Kamenica, Kovilj, Kisač, Veternik, Rumenka, Begeč, Šangaj and Kać.

City of Novi Sad:

- Branko Radičević primary school, Futoška 5, Novi Sad
- Dositej Obradović primary school, Filipa Filipovića 3, Novi Sad
- Dušan Radović primary school, Čenejska 61, Novi Sad
- Đorđe Natošević primary school, Maksima Gorkog 54, Novi Sad
- Đura Daničić primary school, Dušana Vasiljeva 19, Novi Sad
- Ivan Gundulić primary school, Gundilićeva 9, Novi Sad
- Ivo Lola Ripar primary school, Kraljevića Marka 2a, Novi Sad
- Jovan Popović primary school, Ravanička 2, Novi Sad
- Jožef Atila primary school, Šarplaninska 28, Novi Sad
- Kosta Trifković primary school, Berislava Berića 2, Novi Sad
- Miloš Crnjanski primary school, Anđe Ranković 2, Novi Sad
- Nikola Tesla primary school, Futoška 25a, Novi Sad
- Petefi Šandor primary school, Bore Prodanovića 15a, Novi Sad
- Prva vojvođanska brigada primary school, Seljačkih buna 51a, Novi Sad
- Sonja Marinković primary school, Puškinova 28, Novi Sad
- Svetozar Marković Toza primary school, Janka Čmelika 89, Novi Sad
- Vasa Stajić primary school, Vojvode Knićanina 12b, Novi Sad
- Vuk Karadžić primary school, Radoja Domanovića 24, Novi Sad
- Žarko Zrenjanin primary school, Despot Stefan Boulevard 8, Novi Sad
- Josip Slavenski primary music school, Radnička 19a, Novi Sad
- Milan Petrović primary and secondary school, Braće Ribnika 32, Novi Sad
- Sveti Sava adult primary school, Ognjena Price 7, Novi Sad

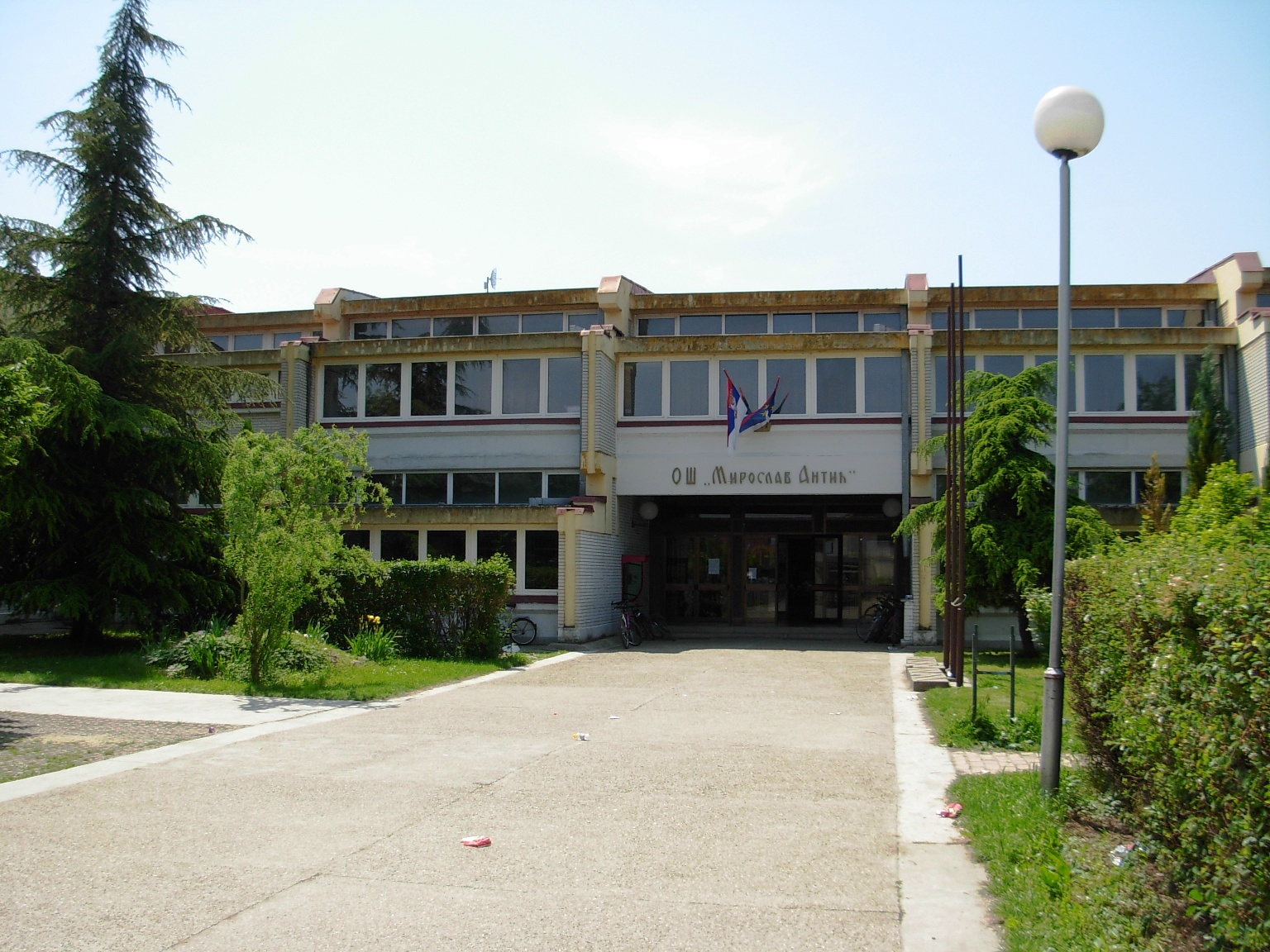
Miroslav Antić primary school, Futog, Novi Sad

Municipality of Novi Sad:

- Aleksa Šantić primary school, Vojvode Putnika 6, Stepanovićevo, Novi Sad
- August 22 primary school, Trg žrtava genocida 1, Bukovac, Novi Sad
- Desanka Maksimović primary school, Carice Milice 1, Futog, Novi Sad
- Đura Jakšić primary school, Kralja Petra I 9, Kać, Novi Sad
- Ivo Andrić primary school, Školska 3, Budisava, Novi Sad
- Jovan Dučić primary school, Preradovićeva 6, Petrovaradin, Novi Sad
- Jovan Jovanović Zmaj primary school, Školska 3, Sremska Kamenica, Novi Sad
- Laza Kostić primary school, Laze Kostića 42, Kovilj, Novi Sad
- Ljudovit Štur primary school, Želežnička 3, Kisač, Novi Sad
- Marija Trandafil primary school, Paunova 14, Veternik, Novi Sad
- Mihajlo Pupin primary school, Kralja Aleksandra 38, Veternik, Novi Sad
- Miroslav Antić primary school, Rade Končara 2, Futog, Novi Sad
- Sveti Sava primary school, Jovana Jovanovića Zmaja 34, Rumenka, Novi Sad
- Veljko Petrović primary school, Kralja Petra I 36, Begeč, Novi Sad
- Veljko Vlahović primary school, Ulica VIII 2, Šangaj, Novi Sad

=== Private primary schools ===
There are 4 private primary schools in Novi Sad verified from the Ministry of Education.

- Miroslav Mika Antić private primary school, Novi Sad
- Sveti Kirilo i Metodije private primary school, Novi Sad
- Svitac private primary school, Sremska Kamenica, Novi Sad
- Tvrđava private primary school, Novi Sad

== Secondary schools ==
The municipality of Novi Sad has 16 public schools whose activity is secondary education, with 4 gymnasiums and 12 secondary vocational schools.

=== Gymnasiums ===
- Isidora Sekulić gymnasium, Vladike Platona 2, Novi Sad
- Jovan Jovanović Zmaj gymnasium, Zlatne grede 4, Novi Sad
- Laza Kostić gymnasium, Laze Lazarevića 1, Novi Sad
- Svetozar Marković gymnasium, Njegoševa 22, Novi Sad

=== Public Secondary vocational schools ===
- April 7 secondary school of medicine, Vojvode Knićanina 1, Novi Sad
- Bogdan Šuput secondary school of arts, Janka Veselinovića 22, Novi Sad
- Isidor Bajić secondary school of music, Cara Lazara Boulevard 67, Novi Sad
- Mihajlo Pupin secondary school of electrical engineering, Futoška 17, Novi Sad
- Milan Petrović primary and secondary school, Braće Ribnika 32, Novi Sad
- Mileva Marić-Einstein secondary school of electrical engineering, Gargarinova 1, Novi Sad
- Pavle Savić technical secondary school, Šajkaška 34, Novi Sad
- Pinki secondary school for professions in transport, Šumadijska 12a, Novi Sad
- Dr Siniša Stanković secondary school of agriculture, Carice Milice 2, Futog, Novi Sad
- Svetozar Miletić vocational secondary school, Narodnih heroja 7, Novi Sad
- Secondary school of ballet, Cara Lazara Boulevard 67, Novi Sad
- Secondary school of mechanics, Kralja Petra I Boulevard 38, Novi Sad

==== Mihajlo Pupin secondary school of electrical engineering, Novi Sad ====
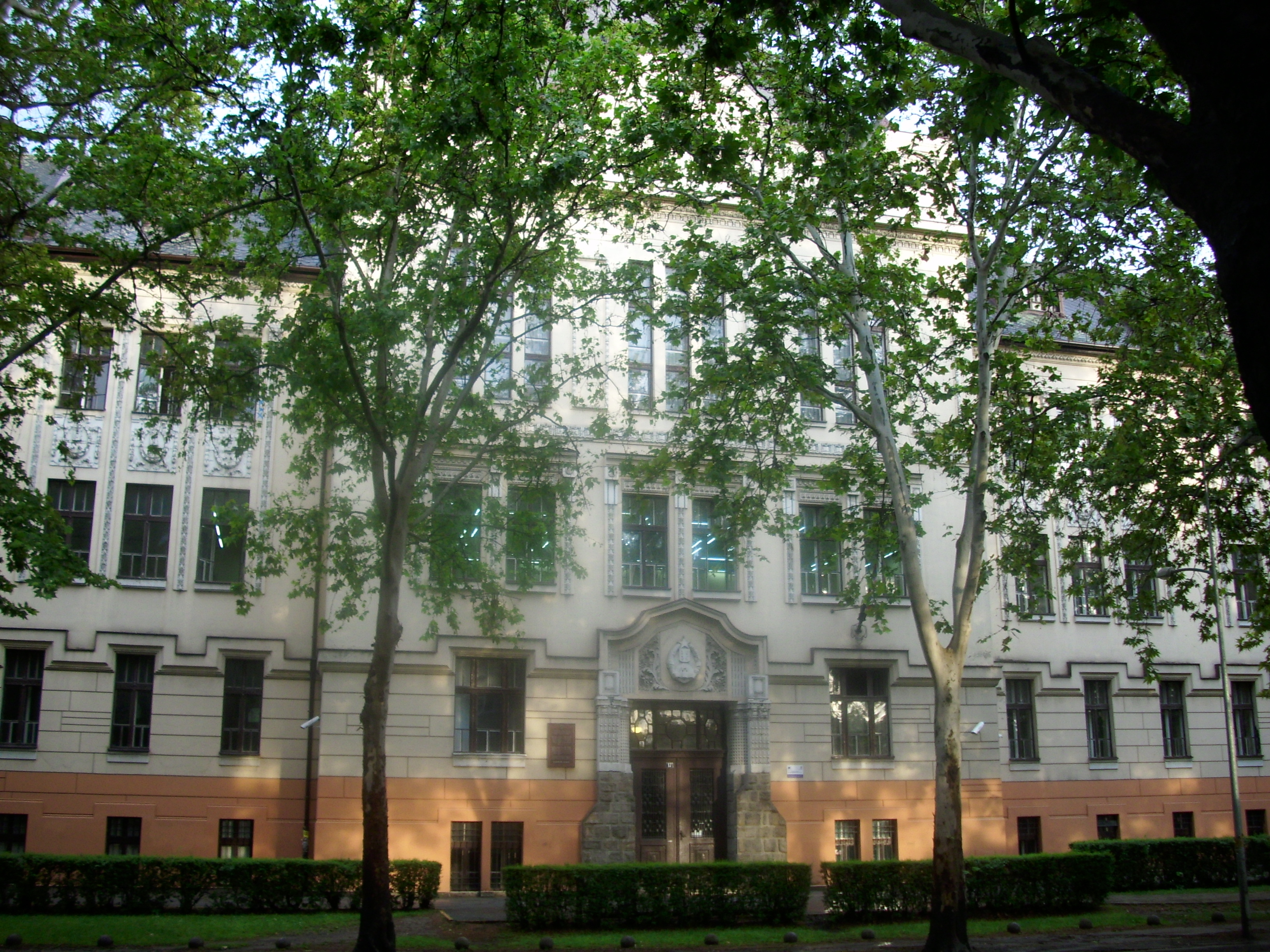
Mihajlo Pupin vocational secondary school of electrical engineering

Mihajlo Pupin (Serbian Cyrillic Михајло Пупин) is a secondary school located in the city of Novi Sad, the capital of the Serbian province of Vojvodina. Specifically, it is located at Futoška 17. It was established on May 16, 1963.

The school provides education for grades 9 through 12, currently holding over 2500 pupils. It is one of the 15 secondary schools in Novi Sad. The school was named after Mihajlo Pupin, a Serbian physicist and physical chemist. Over the years, it has attracted instructors from Angola, Nigeria, and Libya.

==== Pavle Savić technical secondary school, Novi Sad ====
Pavle Savić (Serbian Cyrillic Пaвлe Сaвић) is located at Šajkaška 34. The school provides education for grades 9 through 12. It is one of the secondary schools in Novi Sad. The school was named after Pavle Savić, a Serbian physicist and chemist.

==== Secondary school of mechanical engineering, Novi Sad ====
Secondary school of mechanical engineering, Novi Sad (Serbian: Средња машинска школа Нови Сад" or Srednja mašinska škola Novi Sad") is one of the biggest secondary school in Vojvodina, Serbia. It was founded in 1936. The school provides education for grades 9 through 12, currently holding around 1500 pupils. It is one of the secondary schools in Novi Sad.

==== Svetozar Miletić vocational secondary school, Novi Sad ====
Svetozar Miletić (Serbian Cyrillic Светозар Милетић) is located at Narodnih heroja 7. The school was established in October 1882, and added Svetozar Miletić to its name in 1969. The school provides education for grades 9 through 12, currently holding around 2600 pupils. It is one of the secondary schools in Novi Sad. The school was named after Svetozar Miletić, an advocate, politician, mayor of Novi Sad, and political leader of Serbs in Vojvodina.

=== Private secondary vocational schools ===
The municipality of Novi Sad has 13 private schools whose activity is secondary education verified from the Ministry of Education.

- E-Gimnazija vocational secondary school, Radnička 20, Novi Sad
- E-Gimnazija secondary school of sports, Stojana Novakovića 2, Novi Sad
- MC Vision Academy vocational secondary school, Cvećarska 4, Novi Sad
- Sveti Arhangel secondary medical school of medicine, Trg Marije Trandafil 14, Novi Sad
- Private vocational secondary school, Radnička 20, Novi Sad
- Elite private secondary school of economics and gymnasium, Novi Sad
- Živorad Janković private gymnasium, Novi Sad
- Pašćan first private school of optics, Novi Sad
- Hipokrat first private secondary school of medicine, Novi Sad
- Smart computer sciences gymnasium, Novi Sad
- Dositej Obradović secondary school of medicine, Novi Sad
- Sveti Nikola secondary school, Novi Sad
- Krug secondary vocational school, Novi Sad

== Higher educational institutions ==
=== Public higher schools of vocational studies ===
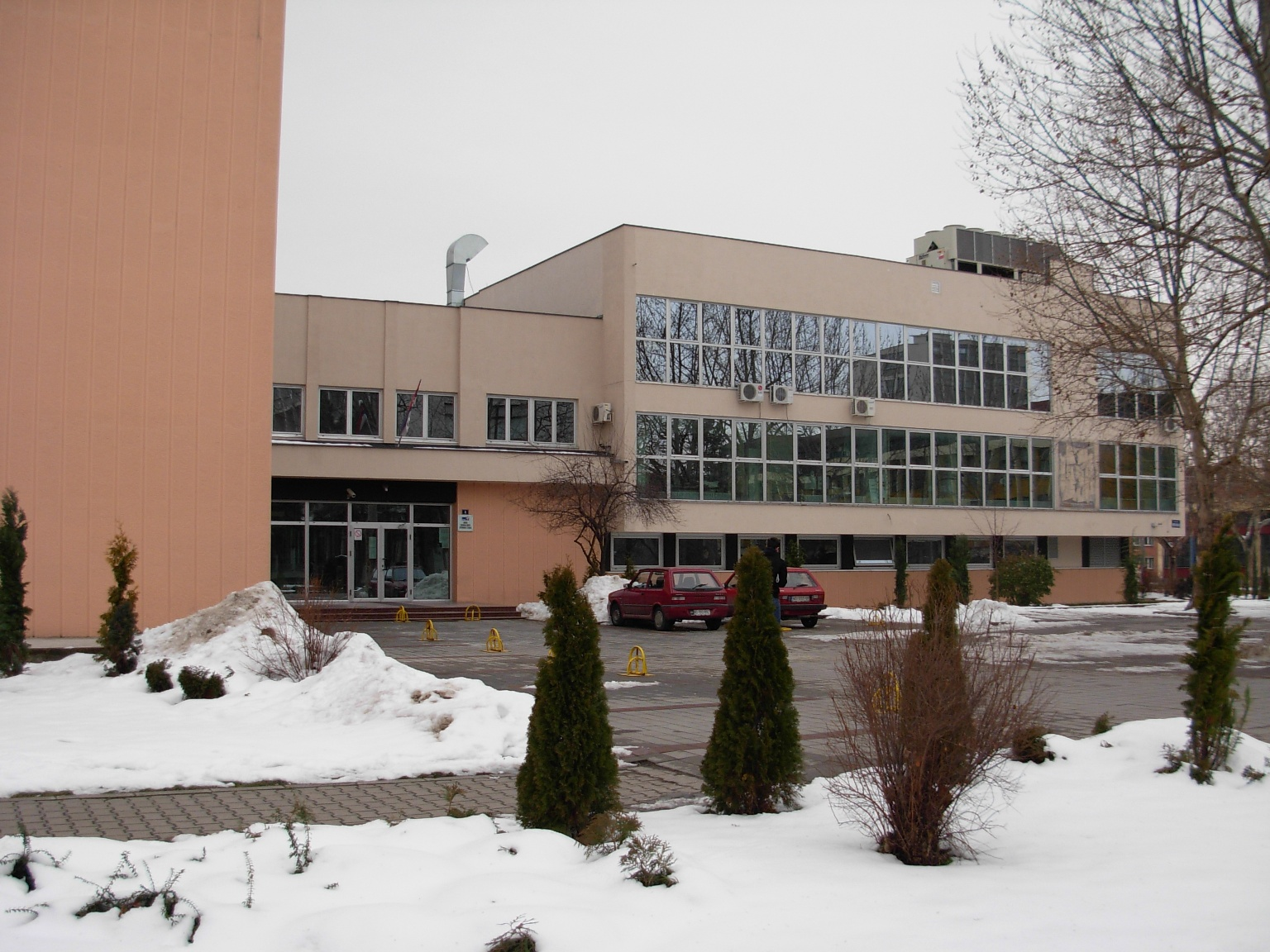
High business school of vocational studies, Novi Sad

Currently there are 2 public higher schools of vocational studies in Novi Sad.

- High business school of vocational studies, Vladimira Perića – Valtera 4 (main building), Kralja Petra I 38 (second building), Novi Sad
- High school of vocational studies for teacher education, Petra Drapšina 8, Novi Sad

=== Public universities and faculties ===
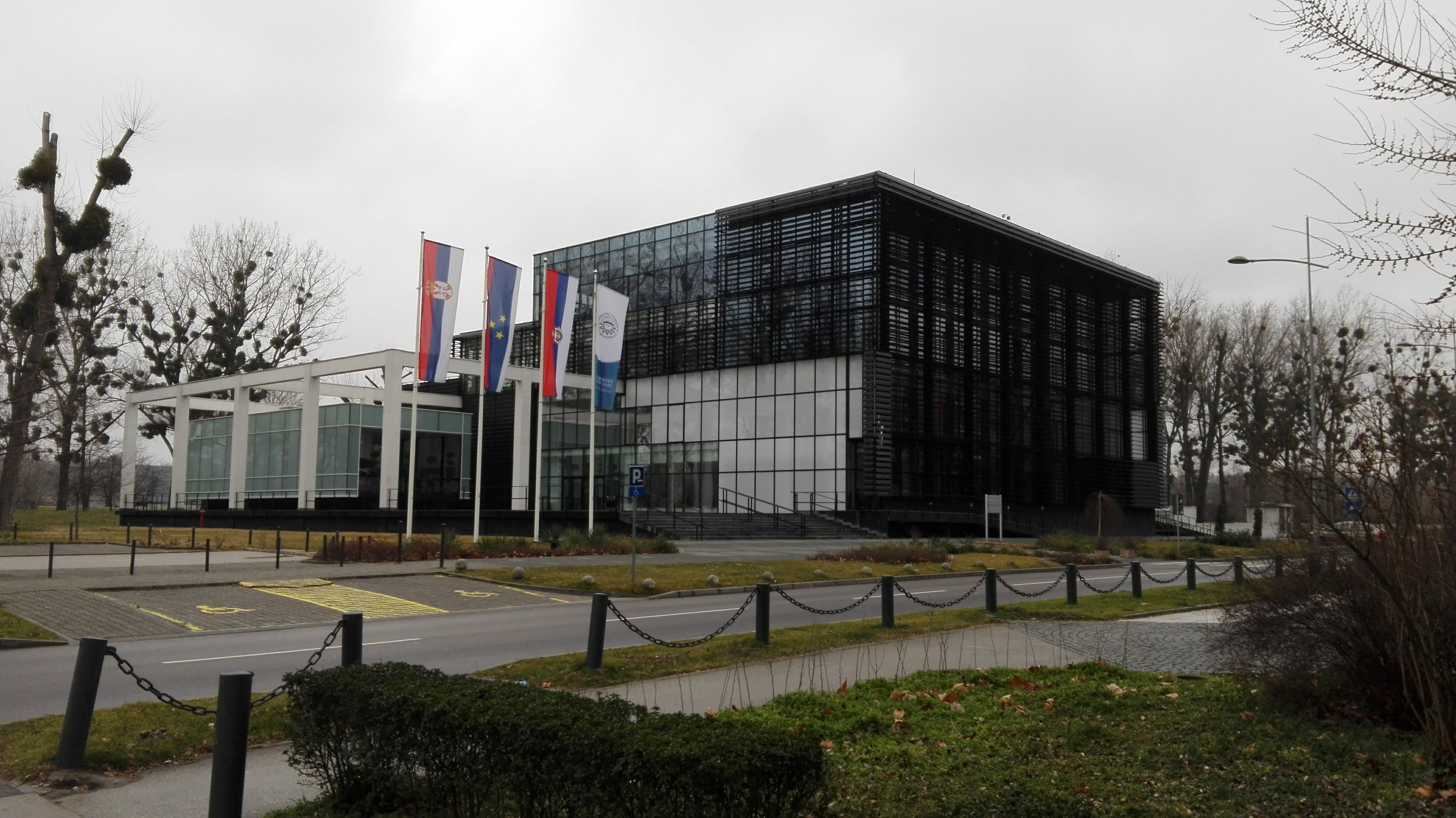
The rectory building of the University of Novi Sad

The only public university in the city is the University of Novi Sad. The largest educational institution in the city is University of Novi Sad with approximately 38,000 students and 2,700 staff members. It was established in 1960 in Novi Sad with a modern university campus. It is composed of several faculties, some of which have their main departments located in Zrenjanin, Sombor, or Subotica.

- University of Novi Sad
  - Faculty of Technical Sciences, Trg Dositeja Obradovića 6, Novi Sad
  - Faculty of Natural Sciences and Mathematics, Trg Dositeja Obradovica 3, Novi Sad
  - Faculty of Philosophy, Dr Zorana Đinđića 2, Novi Sad
  - Faculty of Medicine, Hajduk Veljkova 3, Novi Sad
  - Faculty of Economics, Dr Sime Miloševića 16, Novi Sad (primary location in Subotica)
  - Faculty of Law, Trg Dositeja Obradovića 1, Novi Sad
  - Faculty of Agriculture, Trg Dositeja Obradovića 8, Novi Sad
  - Mihajlo Pupin Technical Faculty, Đure Đakovića bb, Zrenjanin
  - Faculty of Sport and Physical Education, Lovćenska 16, Novi Sad
  - Faculty of Technology, Cara Lazara Boulevard 1, Novi Sad
  - Faculty of Arts, Đure jakšića 7, Novi Sad
  - Faculty of Pedagogy, Podgorička 4, Sombor
  - Faculty of Civil Engineering, Kozaračka 2a, Subotica
  - Hungarian Faculty for Teachers, Štrosmajerova 11, Subotica

=== Private universities and faculties ===
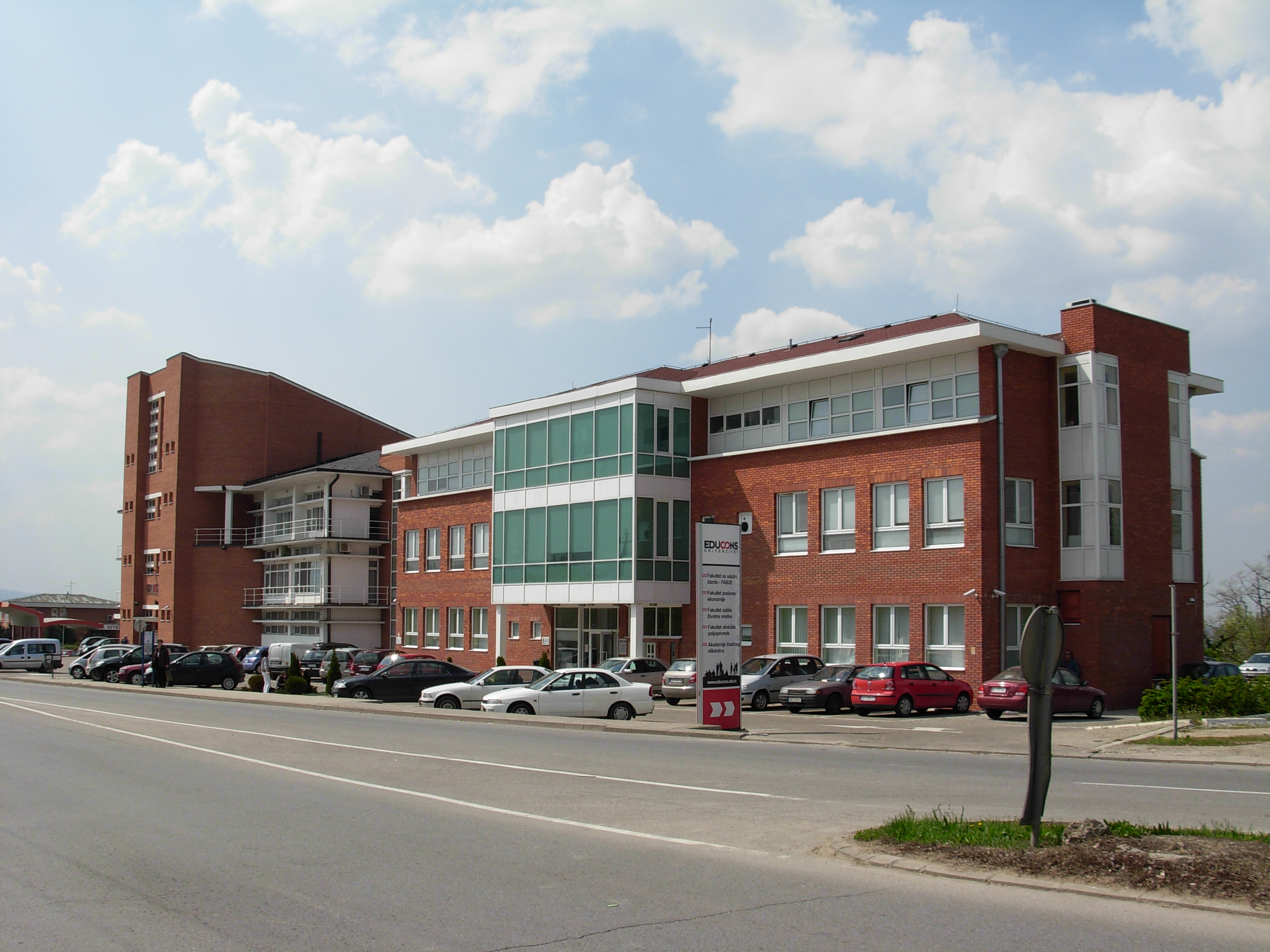
University of Educons, Sremska Kamenica, Novi Sad

Novi Sad has several private universities accredited by the Ministry of Education, Science and Technological Development. All faculties align their curricula with the principles of the Bologna Declaration.

- Educons University
  - Faculty of Security Studies, Sremska Kamenica, Novi Sad
  - Faculty of Business Economics, Sremska Kamenica, Novi Sad
  - Faculty of Information Technology, Sremska Kamenica, Novi Sad
  - Faculty of Environmental Protection, Sremska Kamenica, Novi Sad
  - Faculty of Organic Agriculture, Sremska Kamenica, Novi Sad
  - Faculty of Digital Production, Sremska Kamenica, Novi Sad
  - Faculty for Teachers, Sremska Kamenica, Novi Sad
  - PMS Faculty of Project and Innovation Management, Sremska Kamenica, Novi Sad
  - FABUS Faculty of Servicing Businesses, Sremska Kamenica, Novi Sad
  - TIMS Faculty of Sports and Tourism, Novi Sad
- Economics Academy
  - FIMEK Faculty of Economics and Engineering Management, Cvećarska 2, Novi Sad
  - Law Faculty of Economics and Justice, Geri Karolja 1, Novi Sad
- Alfa BK University, Belgrade
  - Ф@М Faculty of Management
  - Faculty of Entrepreneurial Management
  - Faculty of Education for Graduated Lawyers and Graduated Economists for Leading Tracks
- Singidunum University, Belgrade
  - FEPPS Faculty of European Law and Policy Studies
- Faculty of Law and Business Studies, Novi Sad
- Pharmaceutical Faculty, Trg Mladenaca 5, Novi Sad
- NSTC Faculty of Theology, Novi Sad
- Faculty of Management, Sremski Karlovci
- Dr Lazar Vrkatić Faculty of Law and Business Studies, Novi Sad

== Learning centers ==
There are several learning centers in Novi Sad that provide additional or supporting studies for primary, secondary, and higher educations.

- Novi Sad Open University
  - Center for Culture
  - Center for Permanent Education
- Azbukum
- Schneider Electric DMS, Industrijska 3g, Novi Sad
  - Center for Young Talents foundation, Industrijska 3g, Novi Sad
