= Lipov Gaj =

Coordinates: 45°14′30.5″N 19°46′40.0″E

Lipov Gaj Липов Гај
- Suburban settlement
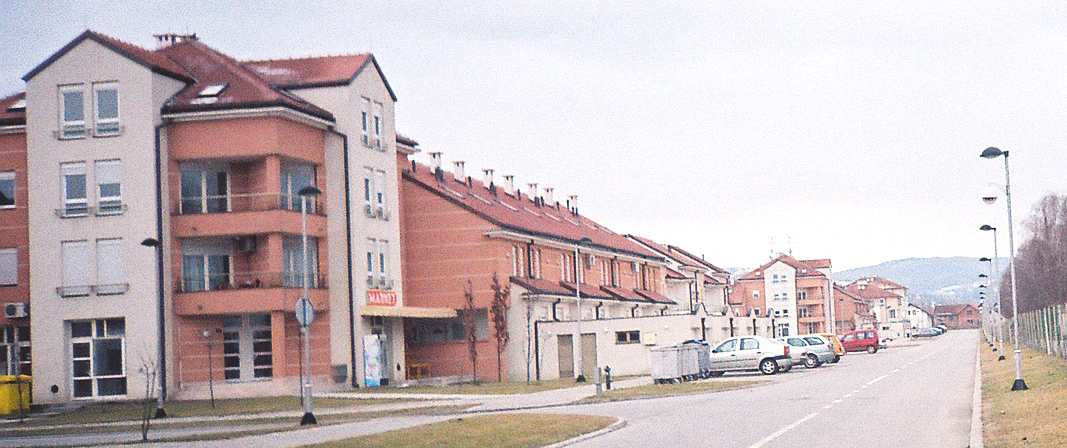
- Lipov Gaj
- Interactive map of Lipov Gaj
- Country: Serbia
- Province: Vojvodina
- District: South Bačka
- Municipality: Novi Sad
- Time zone: UTC+1 (CET)
  - Summer (DST): UTC+2 (CEST)
- Area code: +381(0)21
- Car plates: NS

Lipov Gaj (Serbian Cyrillic: Липов Гај also known as Zepter City) is a suburban settlement of the city of Novi Sad, Serbia.

== Location ==
Lipov Gaj is located between Novi Sad and Veternik. Although officially regarded as part of Veternik, Lipov Gaj has certain characteristics of a distinct settlement.

== Features ==
Lipov Gaj is surrounded by a security fence and there is a security guard at the entrance into the settlement. In the past it was regarded as an elite and upper-class part of the Novi Sad, even though now its houses and apartments are more affordable for middle-class in comparison to the rest of the city.

== Notable residents ==
- Nataša Bekvalac, pop singer
- Dara Bubamara, pop-folk singer
- Nenad Čanak, politician
- Maja Gojković, politician
- Danilo Ikodinović, water polo player

== See also ==
- Neighborhoods of Novi Sad
