= Telep =

Telep Телеп
- Urban neighborhood
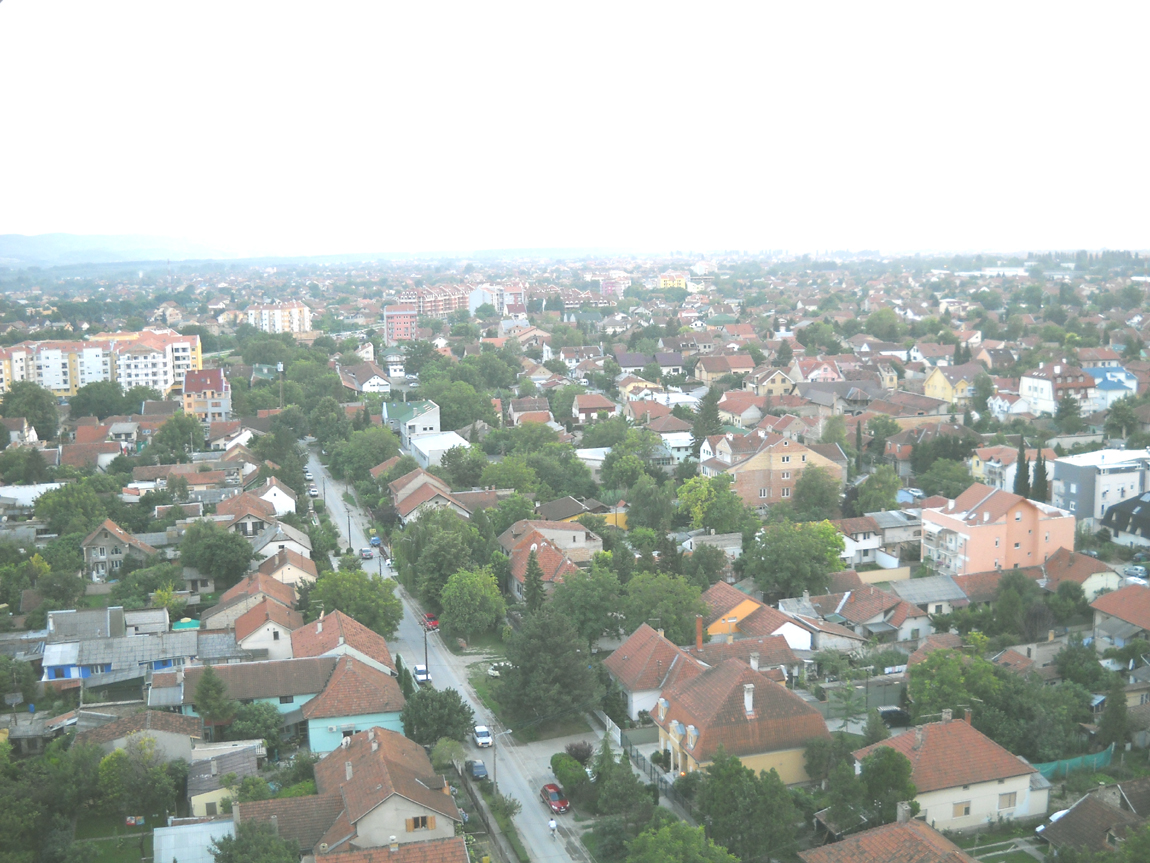
- Panoramic view of Telep

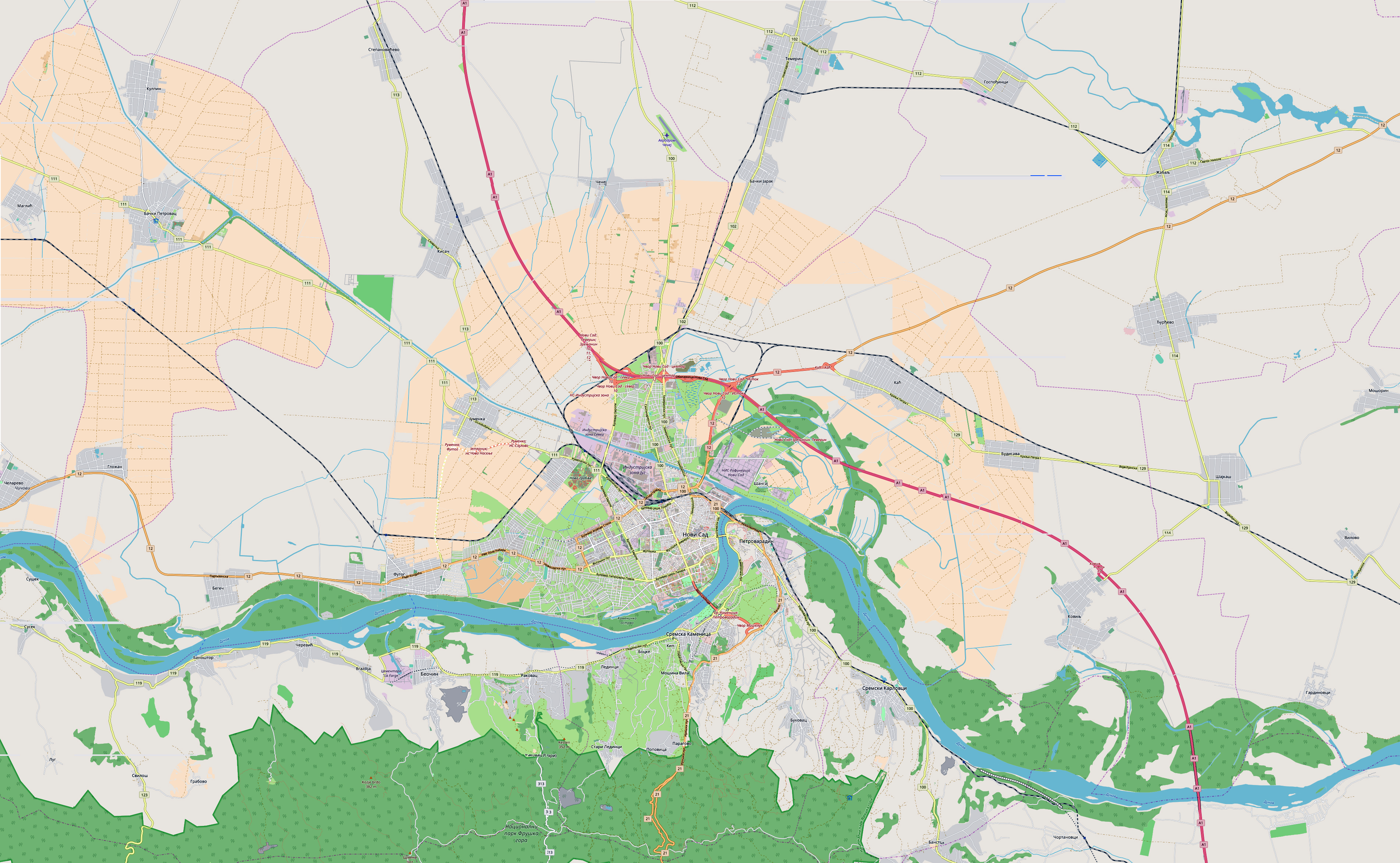
- Location within Novi Sad
- Coordinates: 45°16′19″N 19°52′33″E
- Country: Serbia
- Province: Vojvodina
- District: South Bačka
- Municipality: Novi Sad

Area
  - Total: 5.72 km^{2} (2.21 sq mi)

Population (2005)
  - Total: 17,130
  - Density: 2,990/km^{2} (7,760/sq mi)
- Time zone: UTC+1 (CET)
  - Summer (DST): UTC+2 (CEST)
- Area code: +381(0)21
- Car plates: NS

Telep (Serbian Cyrillic: Телеп) is an urban neighborhood of the city of Novi Sad, Serbia.

== Name ==
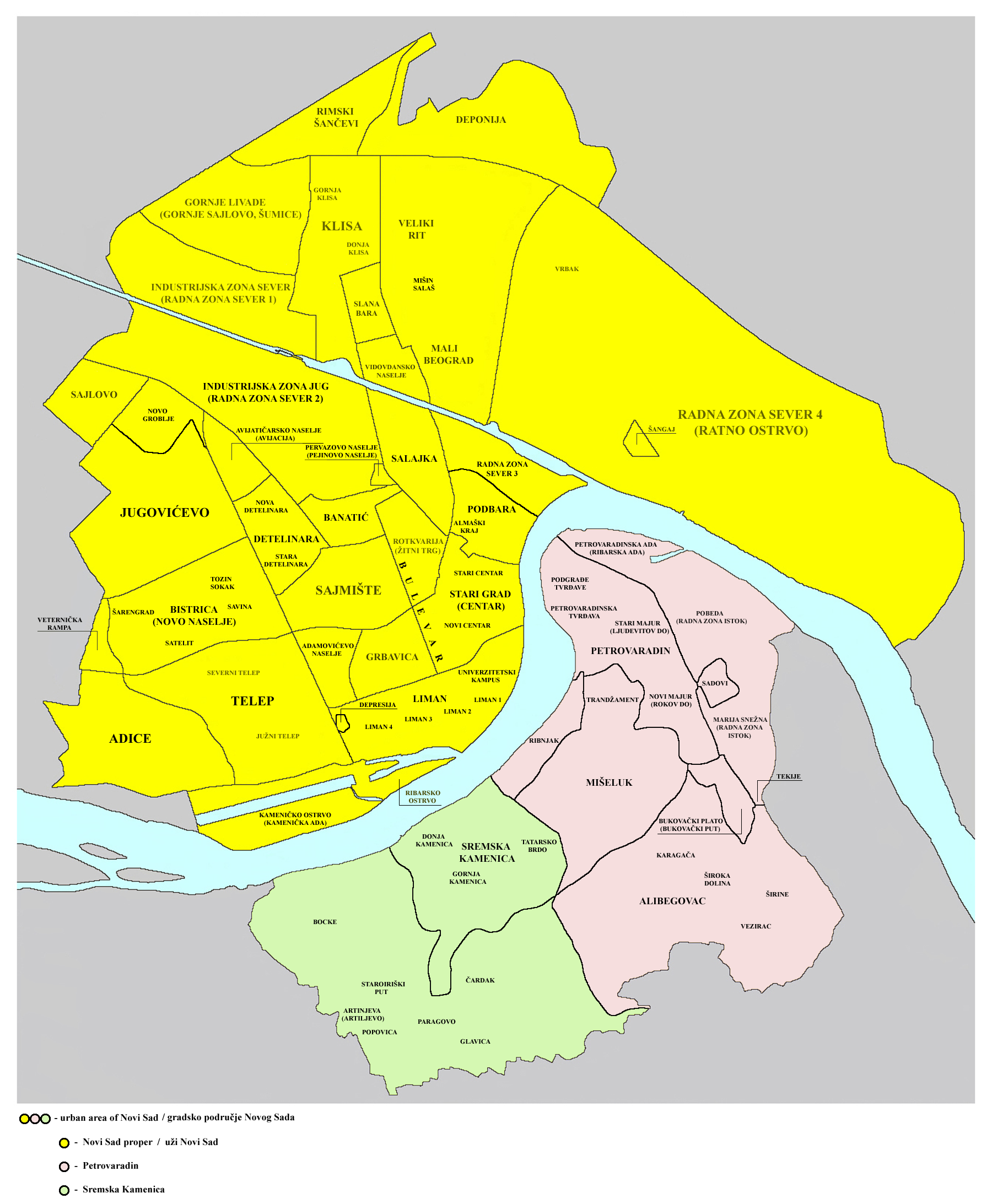
Map of the urban area of Novi Sad with city quarters, showing the location of Telep

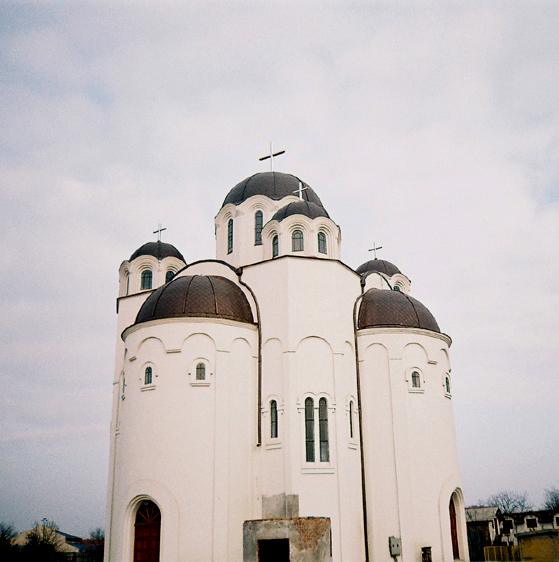
Orthodox church in Telep

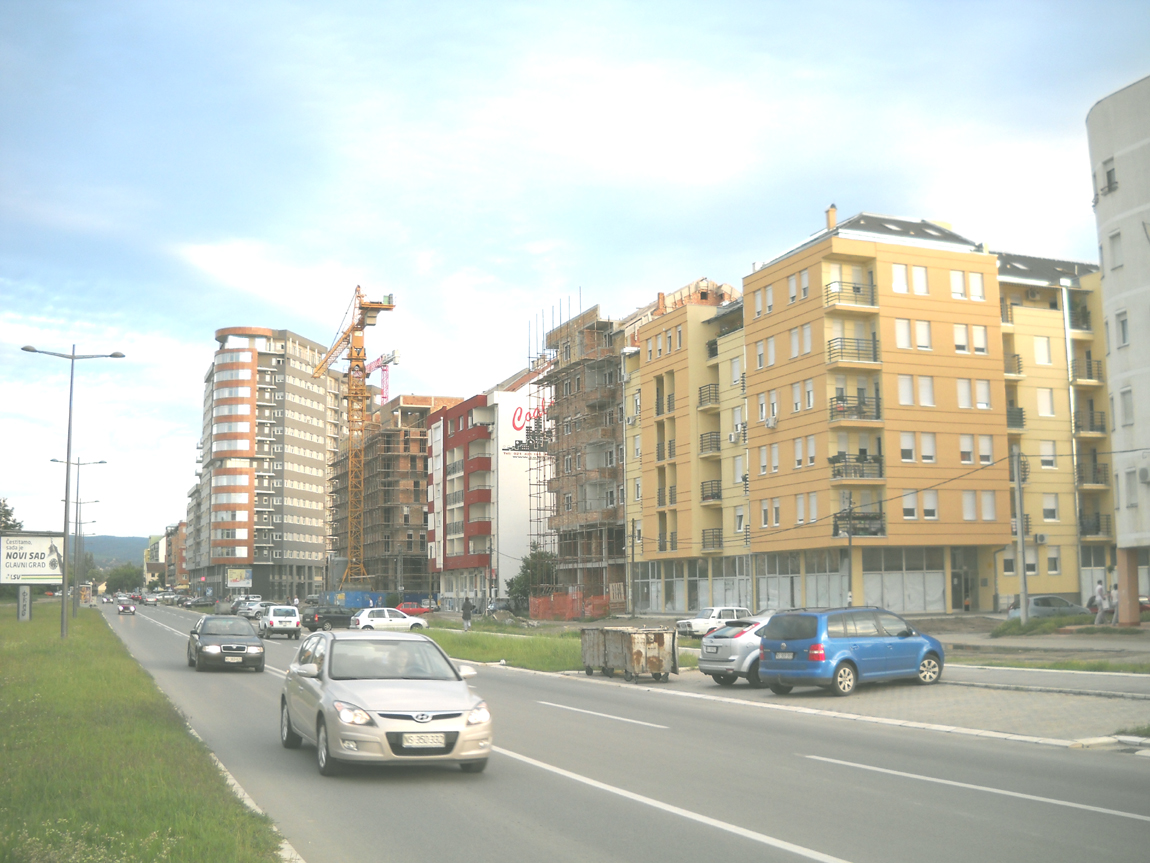
Telep, Subotica Boulevard (Boulevard of Europe)

The word "telep" (Hungarian: Telep) means "settlement" in Hungarian. The first name of this neighborhood was Darányi-telep (Serbian: Daranjijevo Naselje). Between 1927 and 1944, the official name of the settlement was Adamovićevo Naselje (this name was in fact used for both: present-day Telep and present-day Adamovićevo Naselje, which are today two separate city neighborhoods).

== History ==
In the medieval period (13th-16th century), a settlement named Sent Marton (Kűszentmárton) existed at this location.

Modern settlement of Telep started to develop during the 1890s. Initially, settlement existed only in the area of present-day northern Telep, while southern Telep started to develop in 1902. In 1931, the population of the settlement numbered at around 9,000 inhabitants, mostly ethnic Hungarians.

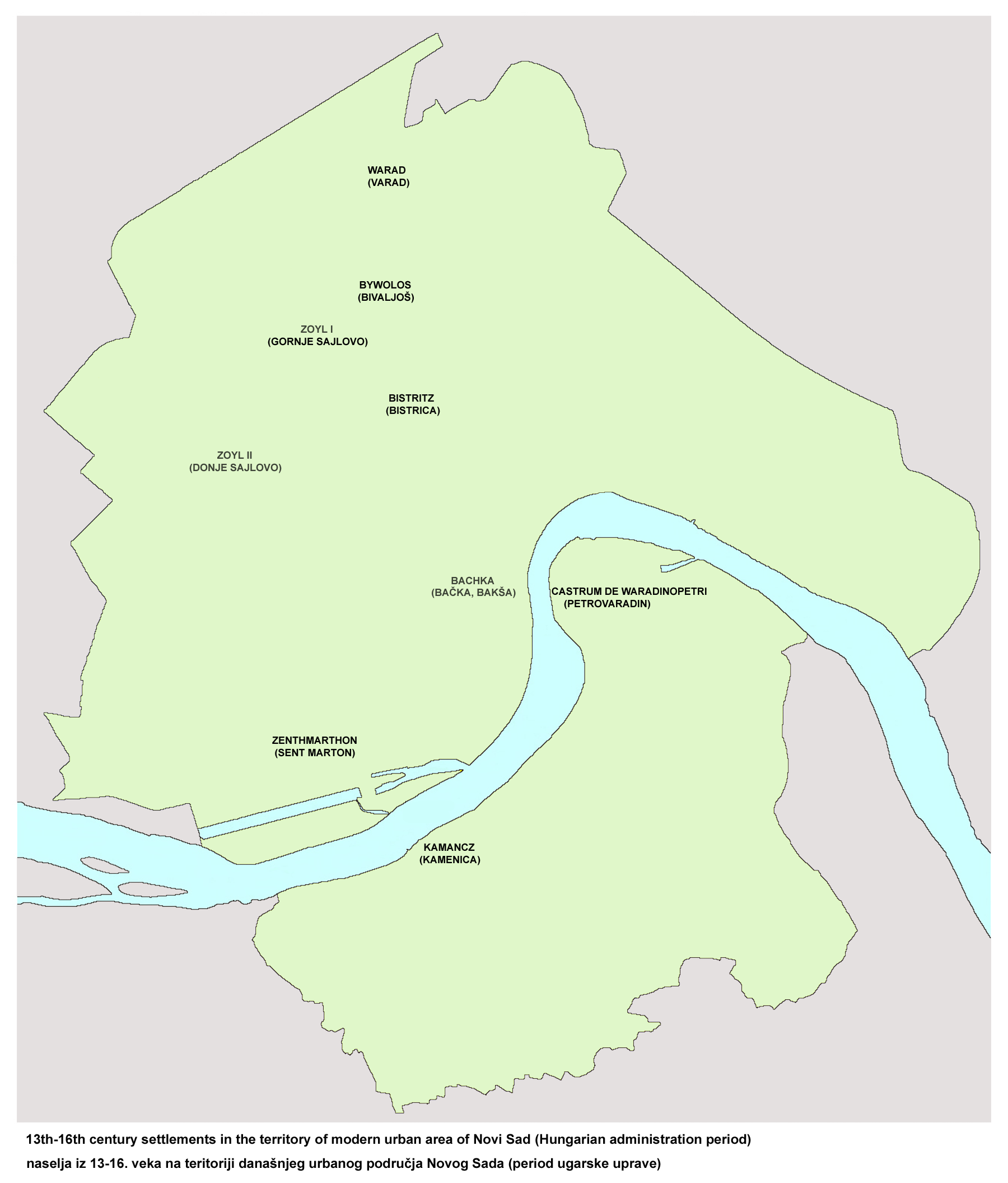
Medieval settlement of Sent Marton in the location of modern Telep

== Population ==
Telep once was an ethnic Hungarian neighbourhood of Novi Sad, while today it is predominantly populated by Serbs. Sizable Hungarian minority is still present in the area. According to an estimation by the city's registry, the population of Telep was 17,130 in mid-2005.

== Geography ==
Telep is located in the western part of the city and covers an area of 3.45 km^{2}. Its northern borders are Futoški put (Futog Road) and Novosadski put (Novi Sad Road), its western border is Šumska ulica (Šumska Street), its southern border is Podunavska ulica (Podunavska Street), and its eastern borders are Ulica Ribarsko ostrvo (Ribarsko ostrvo Street), Ulica Sima Matavulja (Simo Matavulj Street), and "Bulevar Evrope" (Europe Boulevard).

The neighbouring settlements are: Bistrica and Satelit in the north, Adamovićevo Naselje and Liman IV in the east, Kameničko ostrvo (not a settlement, but a tourist destination) in the south, and Adice in the west.

Telep is divided into Northern Telep and Southern Telep. A new Somborski bulevar (Sombor Boulevard), later named Bulevar Patrijarha Pavla (Patriarch Pavle Boulevard), was built between these two parts of the settlement, at the former location of the rail tracks Novi Sad-Sombor. Bulevar Patrijarha Pavla is the main street in this part of the city.

== Local communities ==
The neighborhood is located in the Novi Sad municipality, and it is divided into three local communities: Južni Telep, Bratstvo-Telep and Nikola Tesla-Telep.

== Culture ==
Telep is the centre of the city's Hungarian population. Also in the neighborhood are a Roman Catholic church and an Evangelistic church. In the 1990s, a new Orthodox church was built in Telep to accommodate the increasing population of Orthodox faith.

In 1945, the Hungarian cultural centre "Petőfi Sándor" was established in Telep, which preserves the local culture of Hungarians in the city.

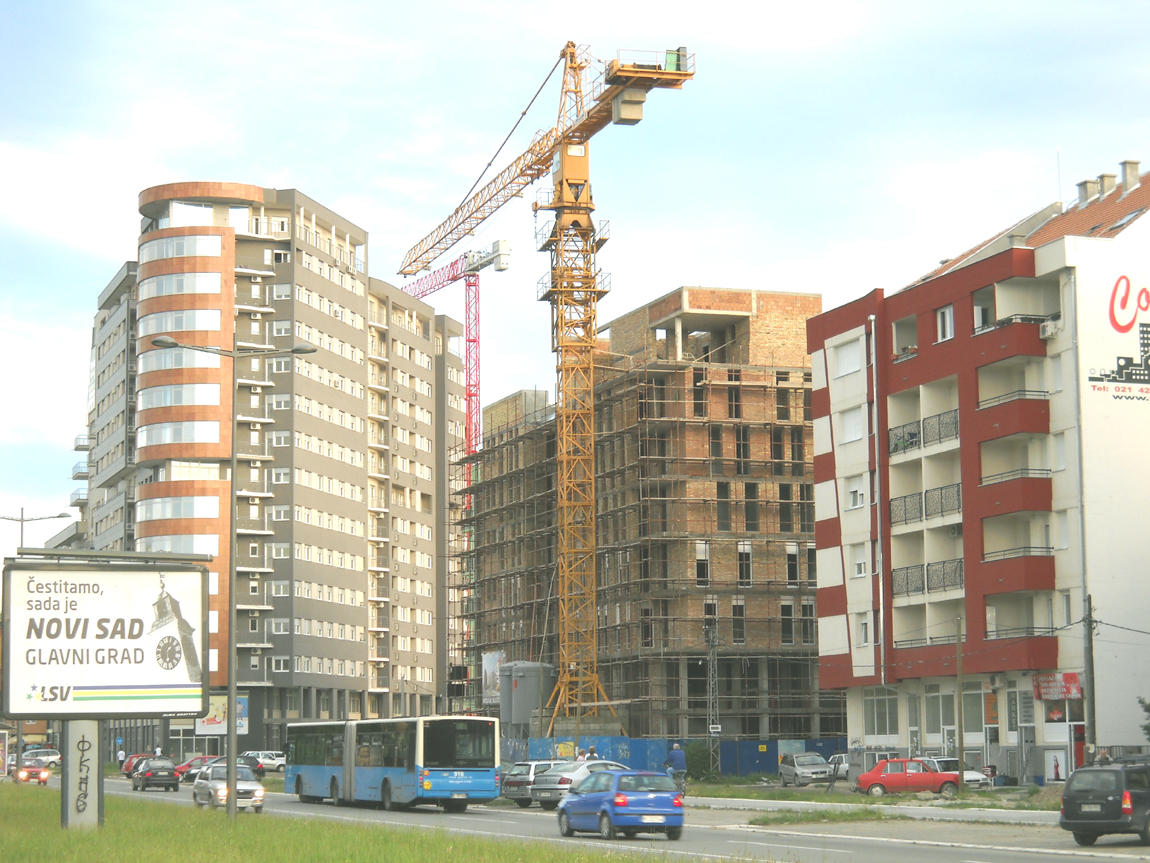
Telep, Subotica Boulevard (Boulevard of Europe)

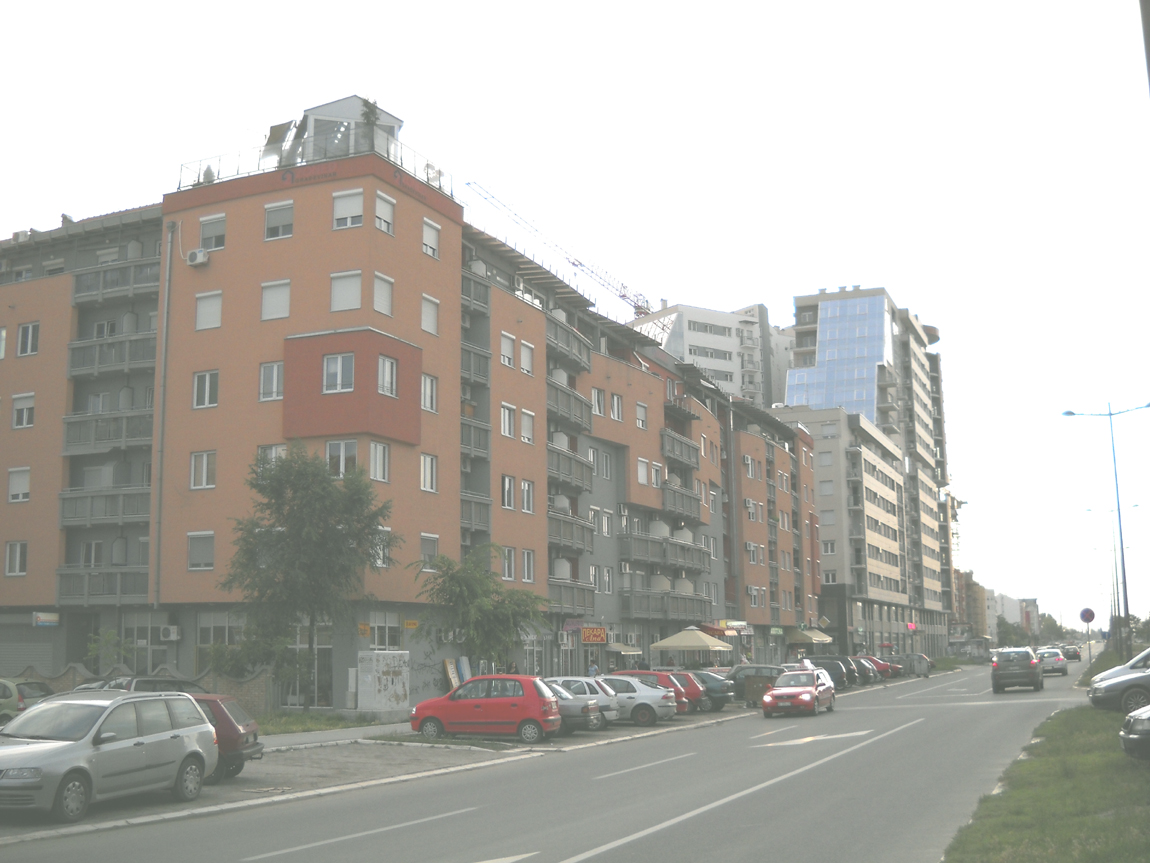
Telep, Subotica Boulevard (Boulevard of Europe)

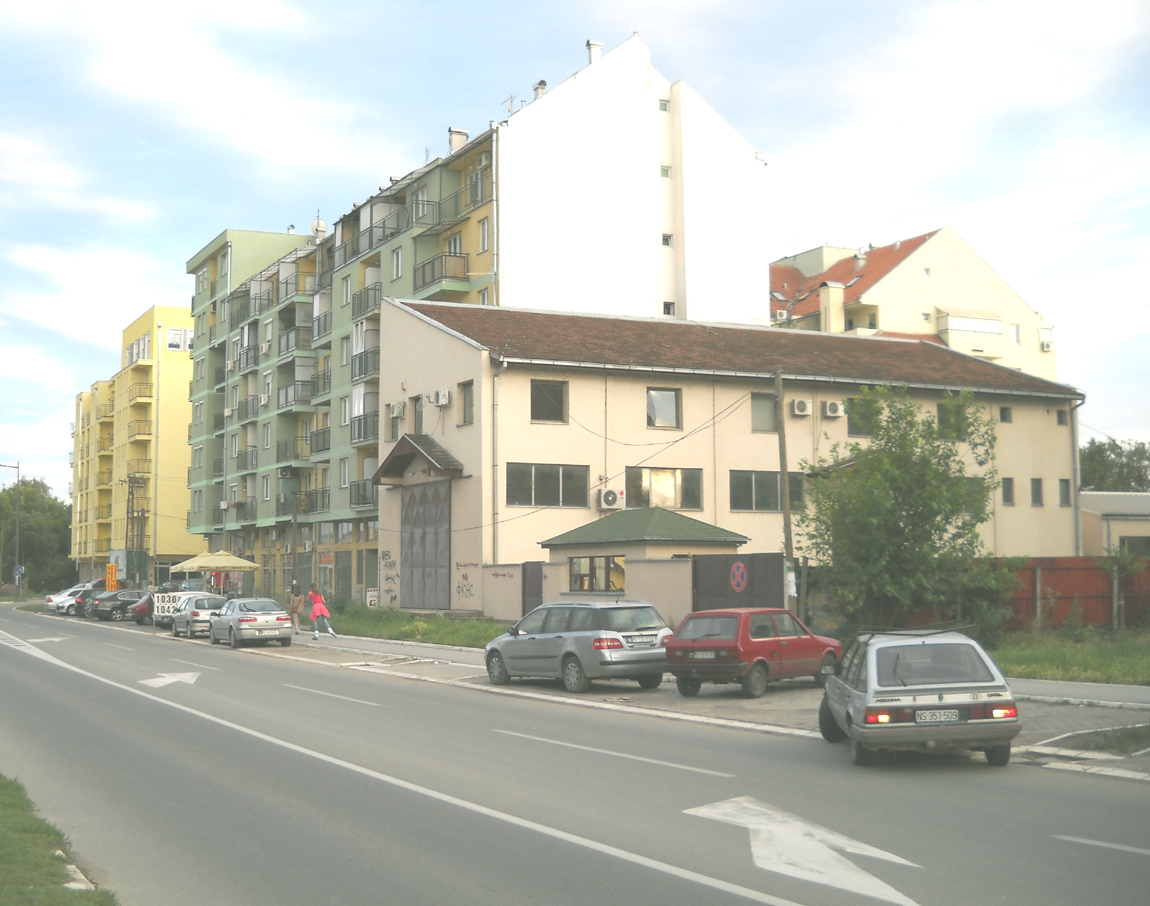
Telep, Subotica Boulevard (Boulevard of Europe)

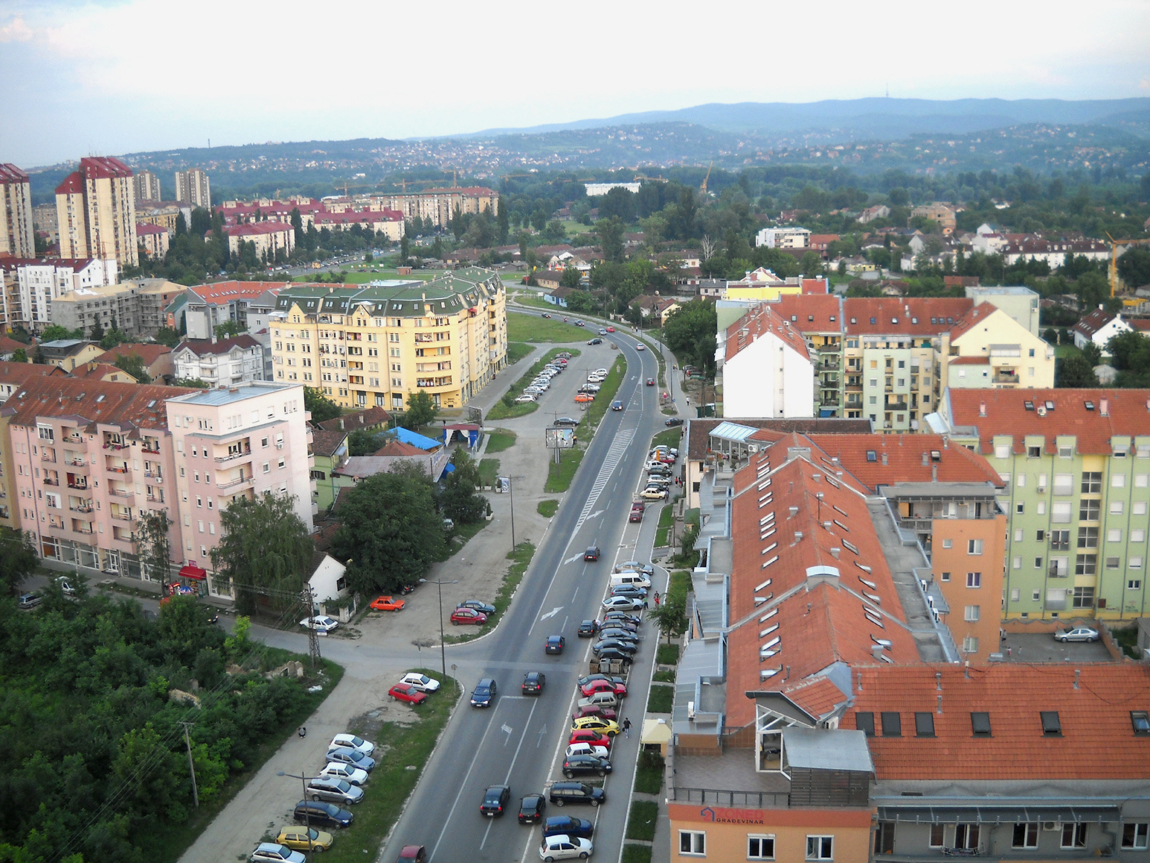
Telep, Subotica Boulevard (Boulevard of Europe)

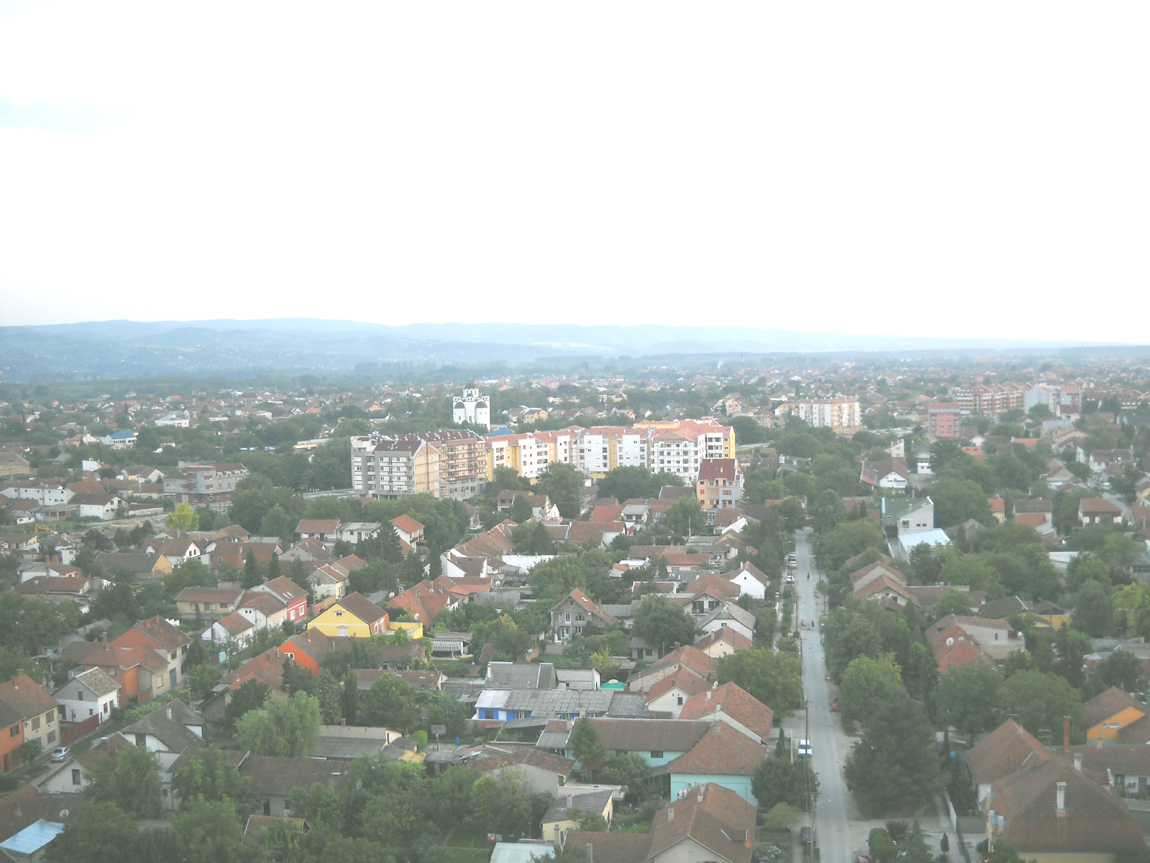
Panoramic view of Telep

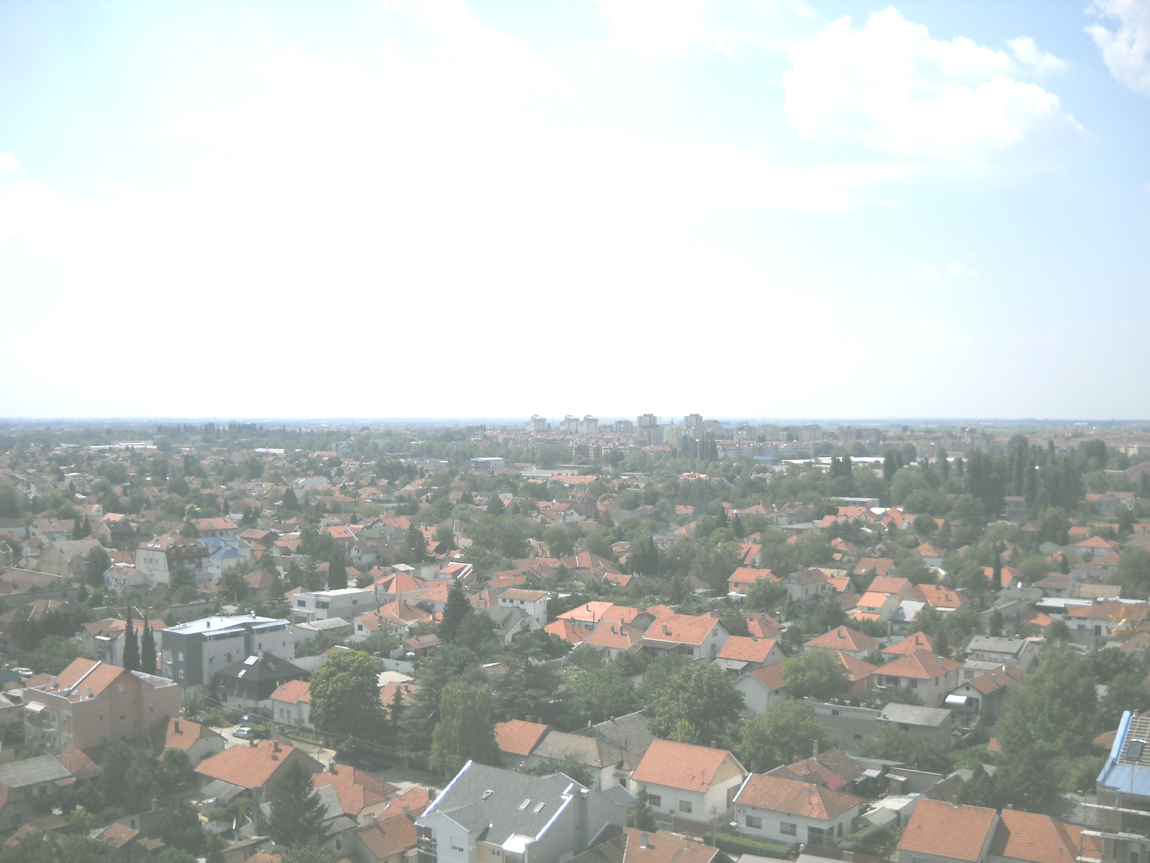
Panoramic view of Telep

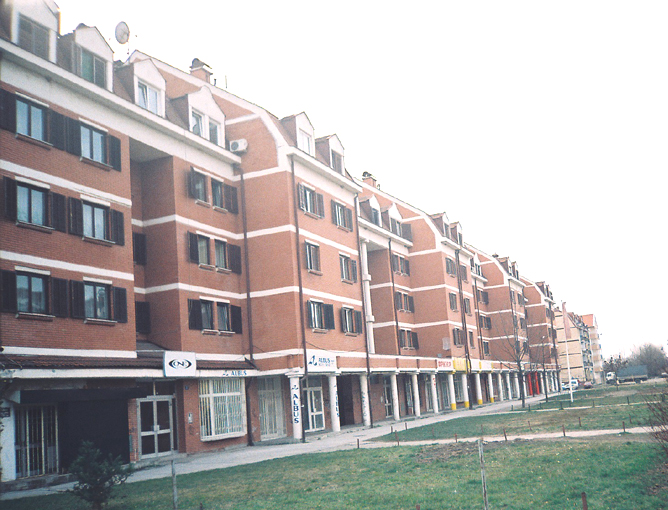
Telep, Sombor Boulevard

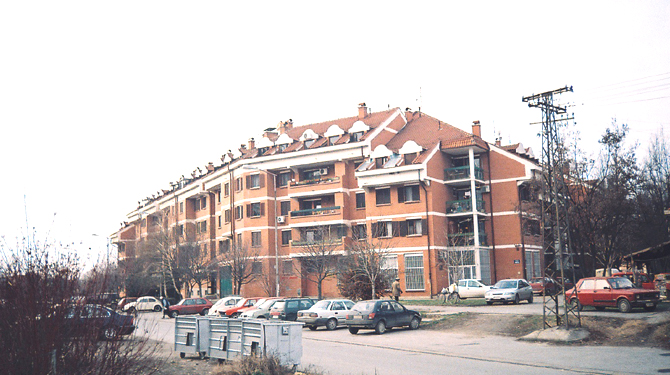
Telep, Sombor Boulevard

== Education ==
- Nikola Tesla Elementary School
- Jožef Atila Elementary School
- Laza Kostić secondary school (gymnasium)

== Transportation ==
The main bus line from the city centre to Telep is No.12, but there is also bus line No.7, which passes along the borders of the neighborhood. Bus lines 4, 9, 11A and 11B also pass nearby.

== See also ==
- Neighborhoods of Novi Sad

== Gallery ==
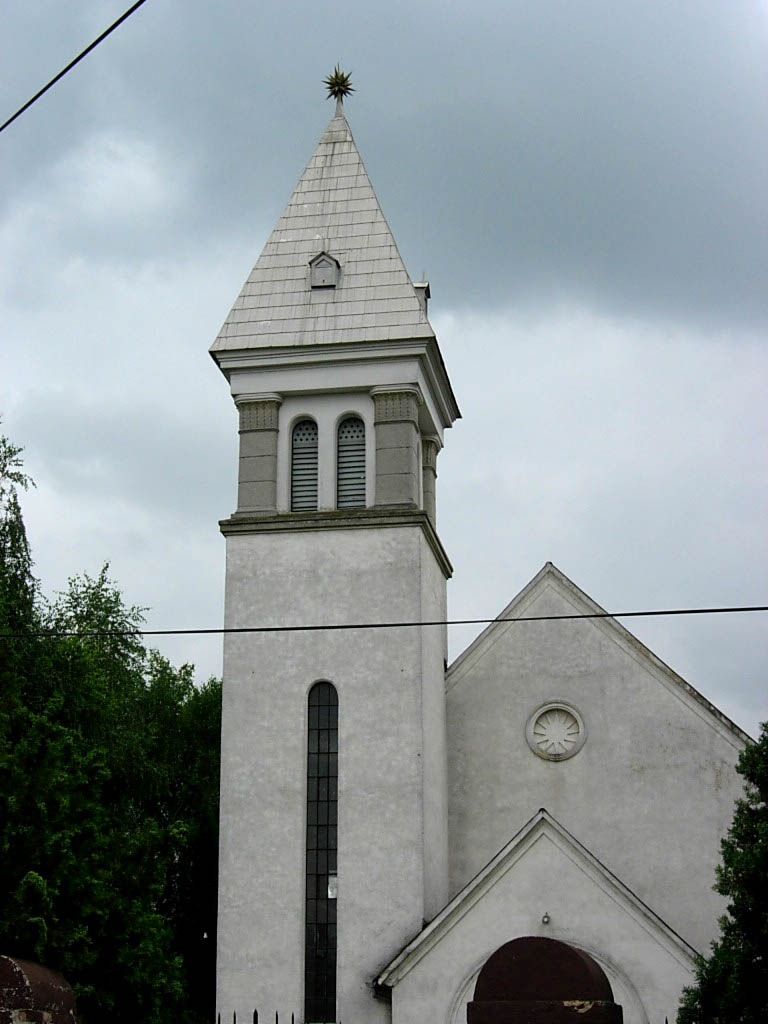
The Calvinist church

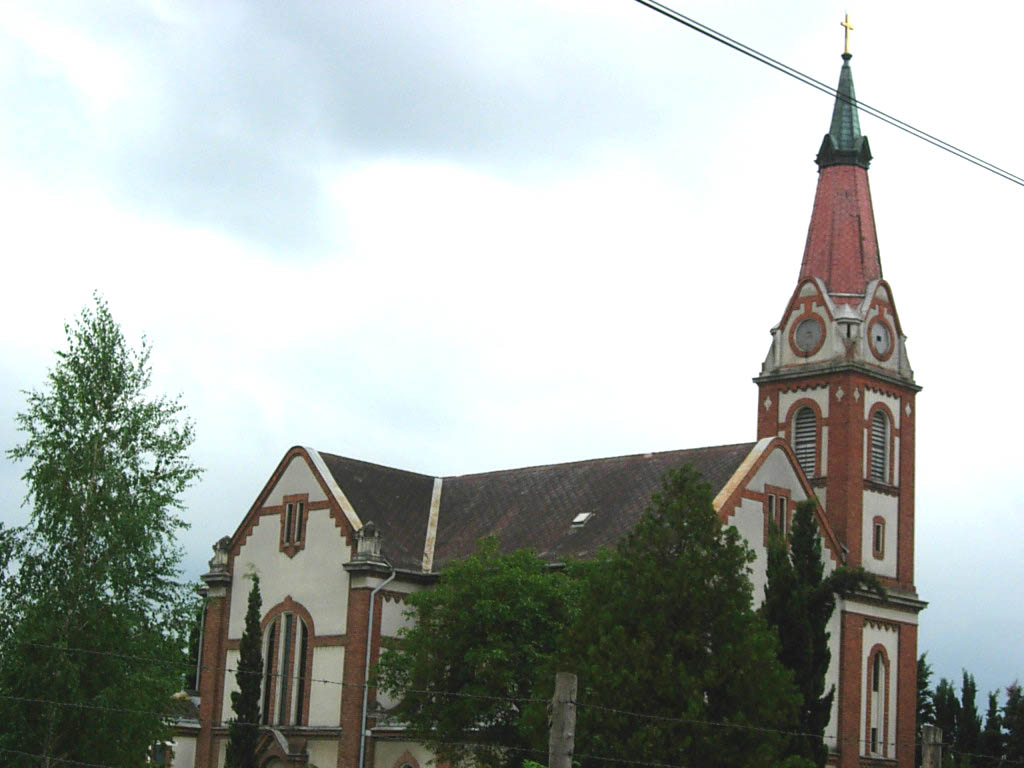
Saint Elizabeth the Hungarian Catholic Church

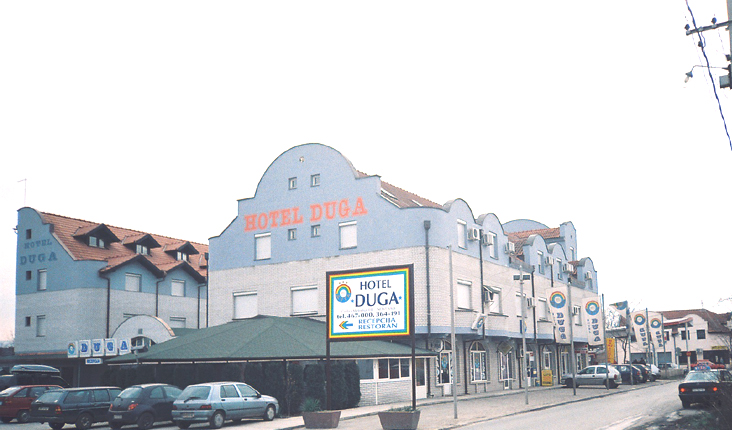
Telep, Hotel Duga

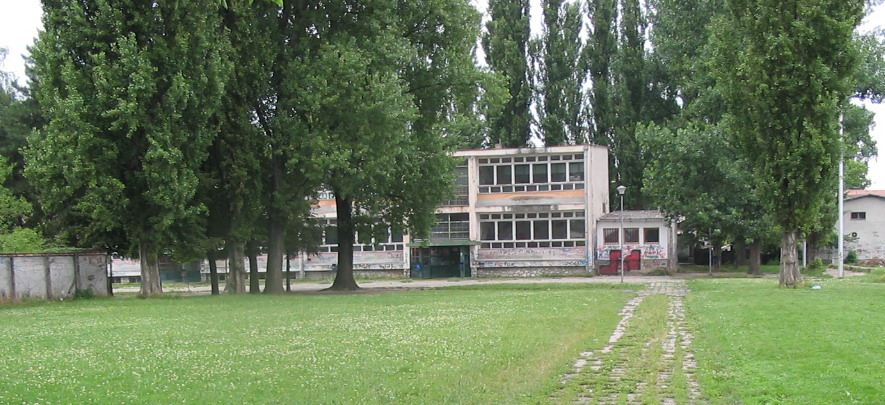
Nikola Tesla elementary school

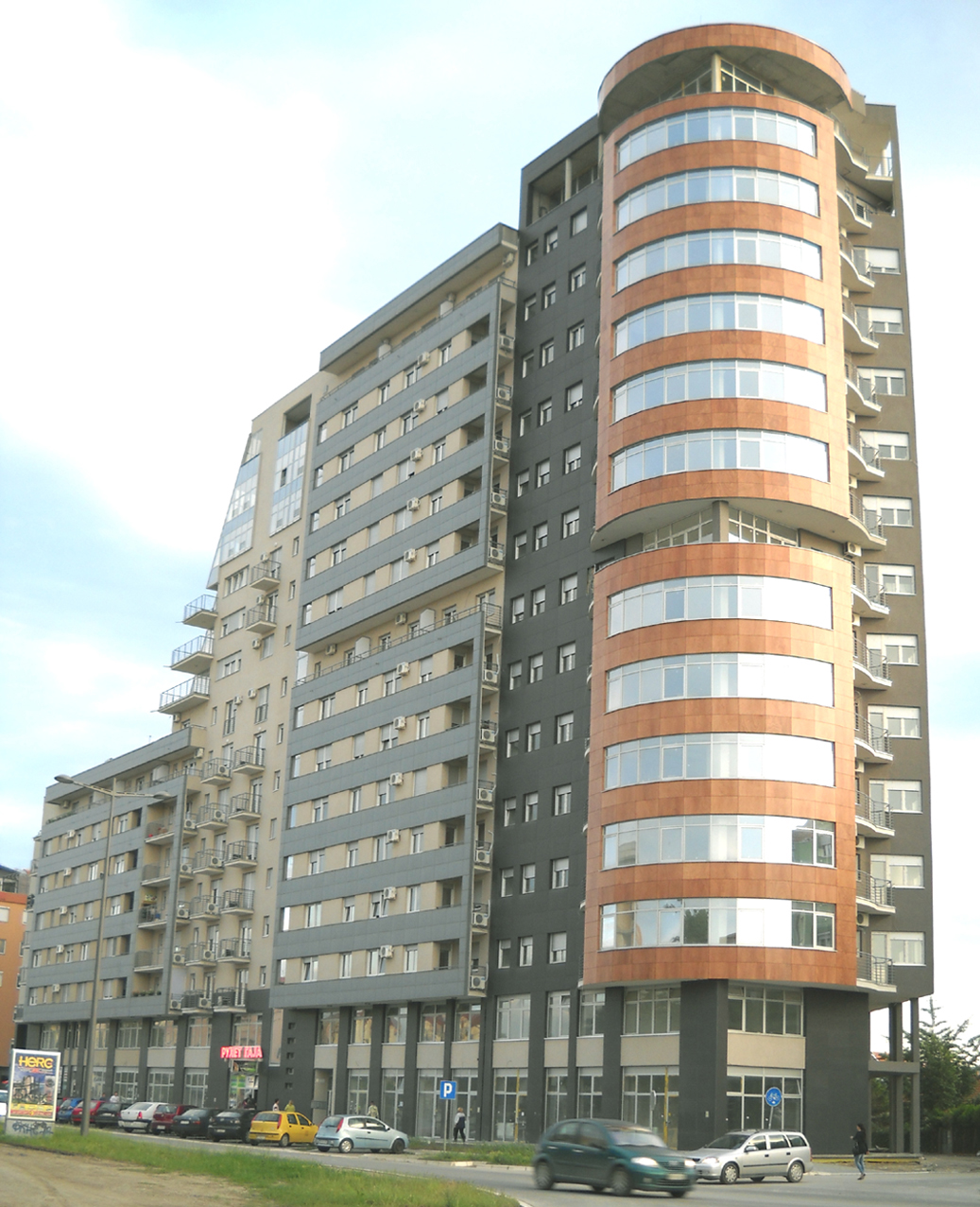
Tallest building in Telep, Subotica Boulevard (Boulevard of Europe)
