= Šangaj (disambiguation) =

Šangaj can refer to:

- Šangaj, a neighborhood and local community of Novi Sad, Serbia.
- Šangaj, Zemun, a neighborhood of Batajnica, Serbia.
- The Serbo-Croatian transcription of Shanghai.
