= Isidora Sekulić Gymnasium =

High school in Novi Sad, Serbia

- Гимназија "Исидора Секулић"; Gimnazija "Isidora Sekulić"

Location
- Vladike Platona 2 Novi Sad, South Bačka, Vojvodina; Serbia
- Coordinates: 45.25194444°N 19.84805556°E

Information
- School type: Public, gymnasium
- Motto: "Радом до знања и успеха" "Radom do znanja i uspeha"
- Established: 14 June 1990; 35 years ago
- Status: open
- Principal: Tatjana Pejović Sebić
- Teaching staff: 52
- Gender: Coeducational
- Enrollment: approx. 1.050 (2022)
- Language: Serbian
- Newspaper: Isidorini Saputnici (2003—)
- Yearbook: Almanah Gimnazije "Isidora Sekulić" Novi Sad (2003—) "Isidorin" četvrtvekovni azbučnik (2015) "Isidorin" vremeplov (2020)
- Website: www.gimnazis.edu.rs

Isidora Sekulić Gymnasium (Serbian: Гимназија "Исидора Секулић", Gimnazija "Isidora Sekulić") is a secondary school in Novi Sad, Serbia. It is named after Isidora Sekulić, a famous Serbian writer. It was founded in 1990. The gymnasium has two educational courses, science-mathematics course and humanities-linguistics course, represented with 8 classrooms (4 for each course path) a year and 32 classrooms in total. Classes are done exclusively in Serbian.

== History ==
=== Beginnings (1990—1999) ===
In June 1990, the Novi Sad municipal assembly made a decision to found the Isidora Sekulic Gymnasium in Novi Sad, appointing Mara Vojinović as its first Principal, while the selection for the schools future professors was done in August. Due to not having their own building yet, classes for the school were conducted in Jovan Jovanović Zmaj Gymnasium, Mihajlo Pupin secondary school of electrical engineering, and in Branko Radičević primary school. In 1992, the building for the Provincial Bureau of Statistics (built in 1936 by architect Slavko Kosirović; original the building for Kraljević Andrej primary school) in Vladike Platona Street was adapted for school use, and since 15 January 1992, the gymnasium was works in that building. January of the same year is the first time Saint Sava Day is celebrated. The 1993/94 school year is marked by extended winter break due to lack of heating from international sanctions on Yugoslavia, as well as the first-generation graduation exam. During these early years the gymnasium became the host for numerous cultural, scientific and educational events, with students reaching the highest places in the Republic's competitions in various subjects. In the wake of NATO's aggression against Yugoslavia and Novi Sad, the 1998/99 school year abruptly stopped during the bombing.

=== Development (2000—onward) ===
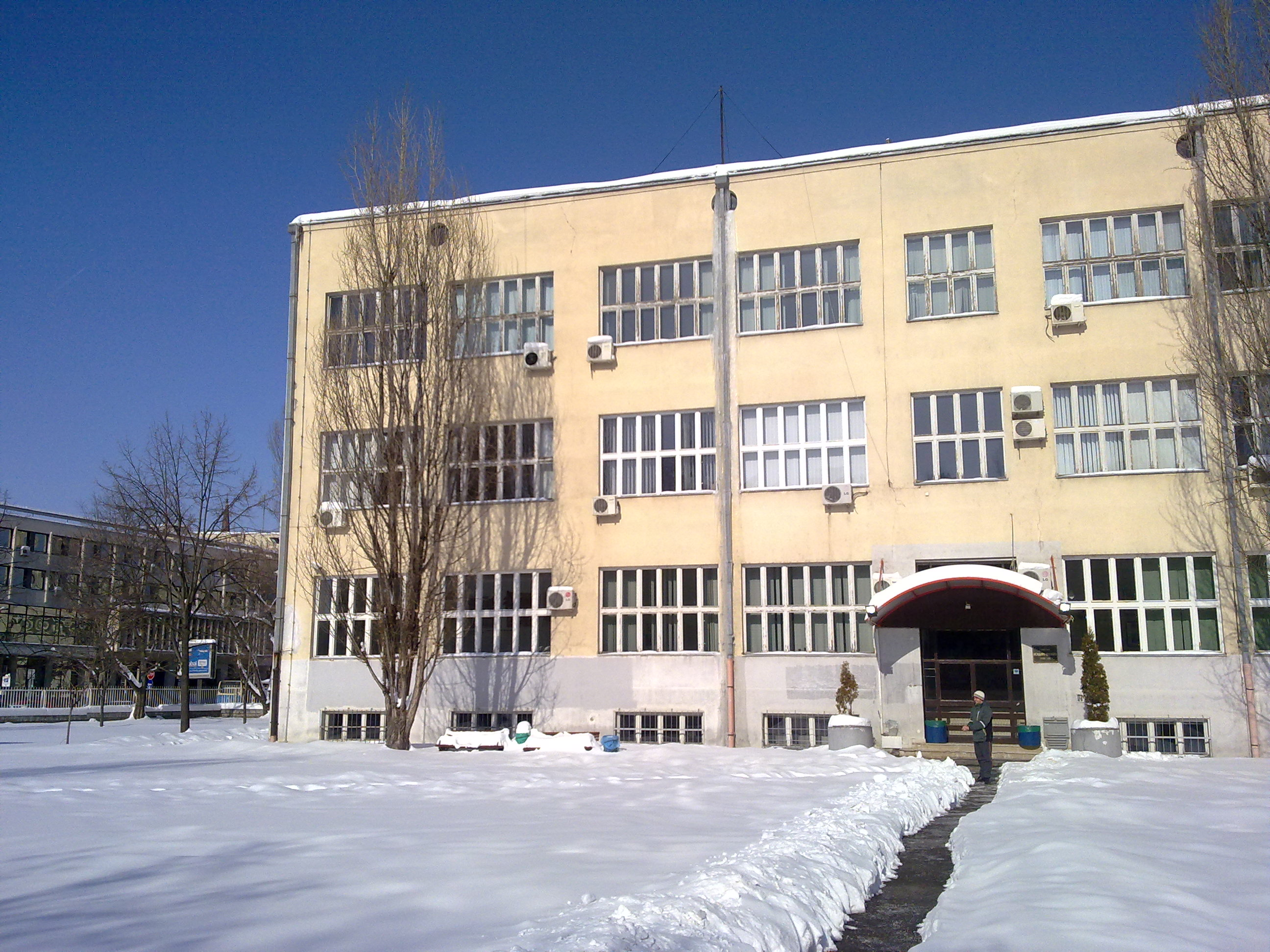
Gymnasium building, February 2012.

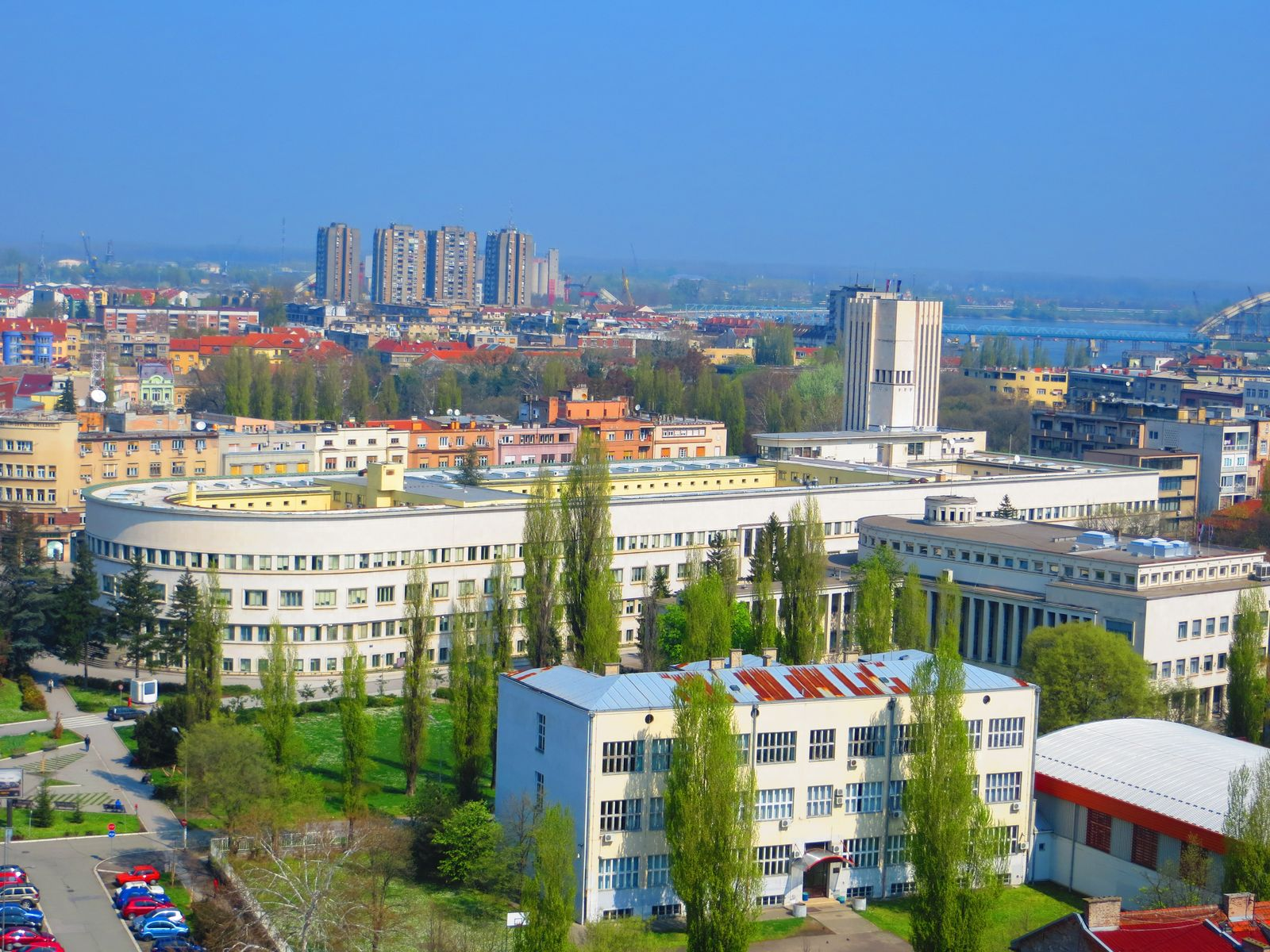
Gymnasium building with the Banovina Palace in the background, March 2014.

In November 2003, construction started of a gym building for physical education in the courtyard of the school, which is 11,000 square meters.

Due to the increased number of students attending the school, plans for the school's reconstruction were made in the late 2010s by Studio D’ART headed by Dubravka Đukanović. The plans encompass: a complete renovation of the buildings foundations; new electrical, heating, and pipe systems; refurbishing of the buildings façade, windows, and doors; dismantling the buildings attic and constructing an additional floor of classrooms and event halls; adding emergency ladders for the roof and an elevator for teachers, staff, and disabled individuals; security cameras; 5 new classrooms and 2 computer classrooms; complete furniture and tech refurbishment of the classrooms. Construction efforts started in February 2020 and were planned to be finished by the end of 2021, enlarging the area from 2,480 square meters to 3,223 square meters. Due to the COVID-19 pandemic, construction efforts halted for several months. During the buildings reconstruction period, classes were conducted in the Secondary school of mechanics, as well as a combination of online and in-school classes to prevent the spread of the virus. The building was finally reconstructed on 24 January 2022. That year, the school celebrated its 30th anniversary (32nd due to the pandemic restrictions postponing the event).

== Events ==
In addition to the numerous clubs and additional classes organised by the respective professors, the Isidora Sekulic Gymnasium is distinguished by the traditional Thursday manifestation, where various cultural, educational and scientific performances and lectures are held in the gymnasium hall.

The IuventaS Gymnasium choir is part of all important school events (such as St. Sava Day, School Day, February 17, Russian Evenings, Happening-a), but often hosts across Serbia and abroad, with its greatest success in 1998, winning the International Festival in Neerpelt, Belgium.

Since 2010/11 school year, the school hosts (along with the AP Vojvodina Assembly and the City Assembly) the International Conference of Grammar Schools 3C - Computer, Communication, Culture. The conference participants come from Russia, Croatia, the United Kingdom, Turkey, Romania, Portugal, Bosnia and Herzegovina, representatives of the Institute for the Advancement of Education and Teaching of the Republic of Serbia, representatives of the Novi Sad gymnasiums and professors from the University of Novi Sad, Faculty of Natural Sciences & Mathematics, Department of Mathematics. The conference was accredited by the Institute for the Advancement of Education and Teaching of the Republic of Serbia

== Accolades ==
In November 2003, the executive council of AP Vojvodina awarded the gymnasium the Dr Đorđe Natošević Award for achievements made on the pedagogical-educational track.

In 2015, the Ministry of Education awarded the school the Svetosavska prize.

== Cooperation ==
During Principal Mr Ružica Vukobratović tenure, the school made cooperations with several schools such as those from Russia (Gymnasium No 13, Lobachevsky University in 2008), Hungary (Korányi Frigyes Gymnasium in 2009), Romania (Mircea cel Bătrân National College), United Kingdom (Chelsea Academy), and Germany (Leopoldinum Gymnasium).

On 20 March 2015, a cooperation agreement between Isidora Sekulić Gymnasium in Novi Sad, Serbia, and Gymnasium No 13 in Nizhny Novgorod, Russia. The agreement was signed by the Principals Mr Ružica Vukobratović and Nataliya Anishenko. This formalised the cooperation between the two gymnasiums, which has been going on since 2008. On July the same year, a cooperation agreement was signed between Isidora Sekulić Gymnasium in Novi Sad, Serbia, and Lobachevsky University in Nizhny Novgorod, Russia. In 2019, a cooperation agreement was signed with Gymnasium No 172 from Nizhny Novgorod.

== Notable alumni ==
- Cveta Majtanović, singer, songwriter, psychologist, engineer, and the winner of the 2004 Idol Serbia, Montenegro & Macedonia competition
- Dimitrije Banjac, actor, comedian and screenwriter, co-creator of the Državni posao television comedy show
- Milan Đurić, politician, lawyer, mayor of Novi Sad (2022–2025)
