= Protestant theological faculty in Novi Sad =

Protestant theological faculty in Novi Sad (Serbian: Protestantski teološki fakultet u Novom Sadu) is a Protestant Reformed theological educational institution in Novi Sad, Serbia. It has an interdenominational board of directors, faculty, and student body.

== History ==
The Protestant Theological faculty in Novi Sad formally established in 2000. As of 2005, over 80 degrees and certificates have been awarded.

== See also ==
- Protestantism in Serbia
