= Azbukum =

Center for Serbian language and culture

Azbukum is a centre for Serbian language and culture founded in 1995. It offers various courses and programs aimed at promoting the language and culture of the Serbs, such as courses in Serbian, Ethno Camps, and Caravans through Serbia. It operates in Belgrade and Novi Sad, Serbia.

It also offers the Serbian Language Online Program, an Internet-based course for those who wish to study Serbian.

The founder and director of Azbukum is Nataša Milićević-Dobromirov.
