= Novi Sad Open University =

Cultural centre in Novi Sad, Serbia

Novi Sad Open University Radivoj Ćirpanov Labor University
- Новосадски Отворени Универзитет; Novosadski Otvoreni Univerzitet; Раднички Универзитет "Радивој Ћирпанов"; Radnički Univerzitet "Radivoj Ćirpanov"
- Type: Private
- Established: November 20, 1952; 73 years ago
- Rector: Prof. Mirko Karakaš, Ph.D.
- Academic staff: 29 (2009)
- Location: Radnička 20, Novi Sad, Serbia
- Website: www.nou.edu.rs

Novi Sad Open University, also known as NOU, was a center offering many courses. It was located in Novi Sad, Serbia. Currently, NOU is a children's cultural center.

== History ==
Novi Sad Open University (originally the "Radivoj Cirpanov" Labor University) was founded on 20 November, 1952, but as the legal successor of the National University, which was founded in 1919, has been present in Novi Sad for 90 years. NOU was given his final form in 1968 when the City's Cultural Information Centre joined his ranks. Thus, the Novi Sad Open University was established as an organisation for general and professional education and cultural information and education for the culture of children, citizens and workers. Since its establishment to date, almost 2.5 million students have passed through the Labor University, undergoing permanent organisational changes adapted to the different needs of society and the population.

Over the years, NOU has achieved co-operation with all the country's science and education institutions, as well as with numerous international institutions, ministries and embassies through which the program was exchanged. As one of the largest labour universities in the country, NOU has always been a leader in the processes of education and cultural presentation in the territory of Vojvodina. A recognizable form of the NOU's work process is also to monitor the latest European and world trends in culture and education.

A number of modern programs were waiting to solve the institution's business space problem, due to the original building of the Labor University (located in Vojvođanskih brigada 7 Street) burning down on 6 April, 2000. The fire started on the 12th floor of the building and quickly spread, taking the life of Milica Prostran, who was a worker from TV "Duga". The cause of the fire was speculated to have been caused by faulty electrical installations. The building and fate of the university itself lingered for over a decade.

In the first years after the fire, building property was mostly city property, while during the time of Mayor Maje Gojković, NOU was expelled from the system of the Novi Sad institutions. Around the 2010s, the city of Novi Sad received 10% of the building ownership with the debt conversion from "Dnevnik Holdings", which had a share of the property. In 2017, an agreement was reached to make NOU a Novi Sad children's cultural center, and then the Republic transferred ownership of the building to Novi Sad.

At the end of 2020, the Novi Sad tech company Vega IT bought the former building of the university for 5,2 million Euros. The reconstruction of the building was designed by the architect Lazar Kuzmanov, the studio in charge of realizing the plan was Synthesis Quatro, while the construction efforts were done by Diagonala i TIM inženjering. The reconstruction of the building started in 2021 and was initially planned to be finished for August 2022, but the deadline was moved for the next year. The building was completed on 30 November 2023. The opening of the Vega IT building was commemorated with an open art exhibition by Svetlana Ninković held until 8 December 2023.

== NOU centers ==
NOU is organizationally was divided into two basic sections: The Center for Culture and the Center for Permanent Education.

=== Center for Culture ===
The most popular program of Novi Sad Open University take place in this center, which develops the taste and criteria of visitors according to cultural values. Through the work of the center, Novi Sad citizens can meet famous and prominent people of the artistic, musical, stage, literary, film and scientific walks of life.

Activities are aimed at spreading and promoting culture in the community. Literary evenings, promotions, film screenings, concerts, exhibitions, summer programs, etc. are organized.

Among the traditional programs, the "Novi Sad salon" is the annual art event for Novi Sad artists, with public stands, artistic creative workshops for adult education, as well as programs for children.

As part of the Children's Cultural Centre, the Novi Sad Open University has achieved co-operation with a number of Novi Sad primary schools through its Creative Workshops Program, which reaches more than 2,500 children annually. With the "Raspustilište" group, the Novi Sad Open University implements the most popular cultural and educational event for children “RASPUSTILŠTE” during winter and summer school holidays.

=== Center for Permanent Education ===
It covers three forms of education: Informal or Permanent Education, Computer Center, and Language Learning Center.

==== Informal or Permanent Education ====
With nearly 110 different forms and possibilities of qualifications and pre-qualifications at all levels of knowledge. Since the United Nations has declared the 21st century the age of education, this center the most promising part of NOU. Permanent education is provided in the form of training, courses, seminars, counselling, creative workshops.

In co-operation with the "Društvo za obrazovanje odraslih" (Adult Education Society), NOU is one of the founders and promoters of the program "Univerziteta trećeg doba" (Universities of the Third Age).

==== Computer Center ====
The Computer Center was founded with the rise of the general use of personal computers. Following modern tech trends, about 16,000 students have so far passed through this center, having taken programs ranging from basic computer literacy to specialized training courses and seminars. NOU has invested large amounts of material resources to provide the latest computer technology.

==== Language Learning Center ====
The oldest foreign language school in the city. Courses are organised for English, French, German, Italian, Spanish, Russian, Greek and Serbian, as well as for the minority languages spoken in Vojvodina. Classes are organised in groups, but in an individual form. The Center organizes courses for ages ranging from pre-school kids, primary and secondary school students to adults. Modern teaching resources and lessons are provided for the realization of the course.
