= Faculty of Sport and Tourism =

Palaces in Serbia

Faculty of Sport and Psychology - TIMS
- Факултет за спорт и психологију - ТИМС / Fakultet za sport i psihologiju - TIMS
- Motto: Tvoj Izbor Menja Sve
- Motto in English: Your choice changes everything
- Type: Private
- Established: 2004
- Affiliations: University of EDUCONS
- Dean: Romana Romanov
- Academic staff: 59
- Students: 500
- Location: Novi Sad, Serbia
- Website: www.tims.edu.rs

The Faculty of Sport and Psychology (Serbian: Факултет за спорт и психологију, Fakultet za sport i psihologiju, TIMS) is a state-accredited private institution of high education located in Novi Sad, Serbia. The Faculty was founded in 2004 and consists of three departments - Sport, Tourism and Psychology.

Since its founding, the Faculty has educated 209 bachelors, 36 magisters and masters, as well as 10 doctors.

== History ==
TIMS started off as an independent College for Sport Trainers and Managers (Serbian: Виша школа за тренере и менаџере у спорту / Viša škola za trenere i menadžere u sportu) in 2001, to grow into the Faculty of Sport and Tourism - TIMS, as it is known today, in 2004. That year also saw the addition of another department - Tourism, rendering TIMS the only faculty dedicated to sport and tourism in Serbia and the countries of former Yugoslavia.

== Organisation and profile ==
The Faculty consists of two departments: the Department of Sport, and the Department of Tourism. Basic studies on both departments last 3 years, master's studies taking 2 years and doctoral studies 3 years.

According to the nomenclature of occupations, the students acquire the following professional titles upon graduation:

from the study programme of Physical education and sport:

- on the level of Bachelor's degree - Teacher of sport and physical education;
- on the level of Master's degree - Professor of physical education and sport - master;
- on the level of Doctoral degree - Doctor of physical education, sport and kinesiology;

from the study programme of Management and business in tourism:

- on the level of Bachelor's degree - The professional title of manager;
- on the level of Master's degree – Graduate manager – master.

== Partnerships ==
TIMS is a member of the Association for Tourism and Leisure Education (ATLAS).

The Faculty cooperates with many other institutions of higher education across Europe, but also with some of the most significant associations, clubs and organisations in the field of sport and tourism in Serbia and the region.
