= Neighborhoods and suburbs of Novi Sad =

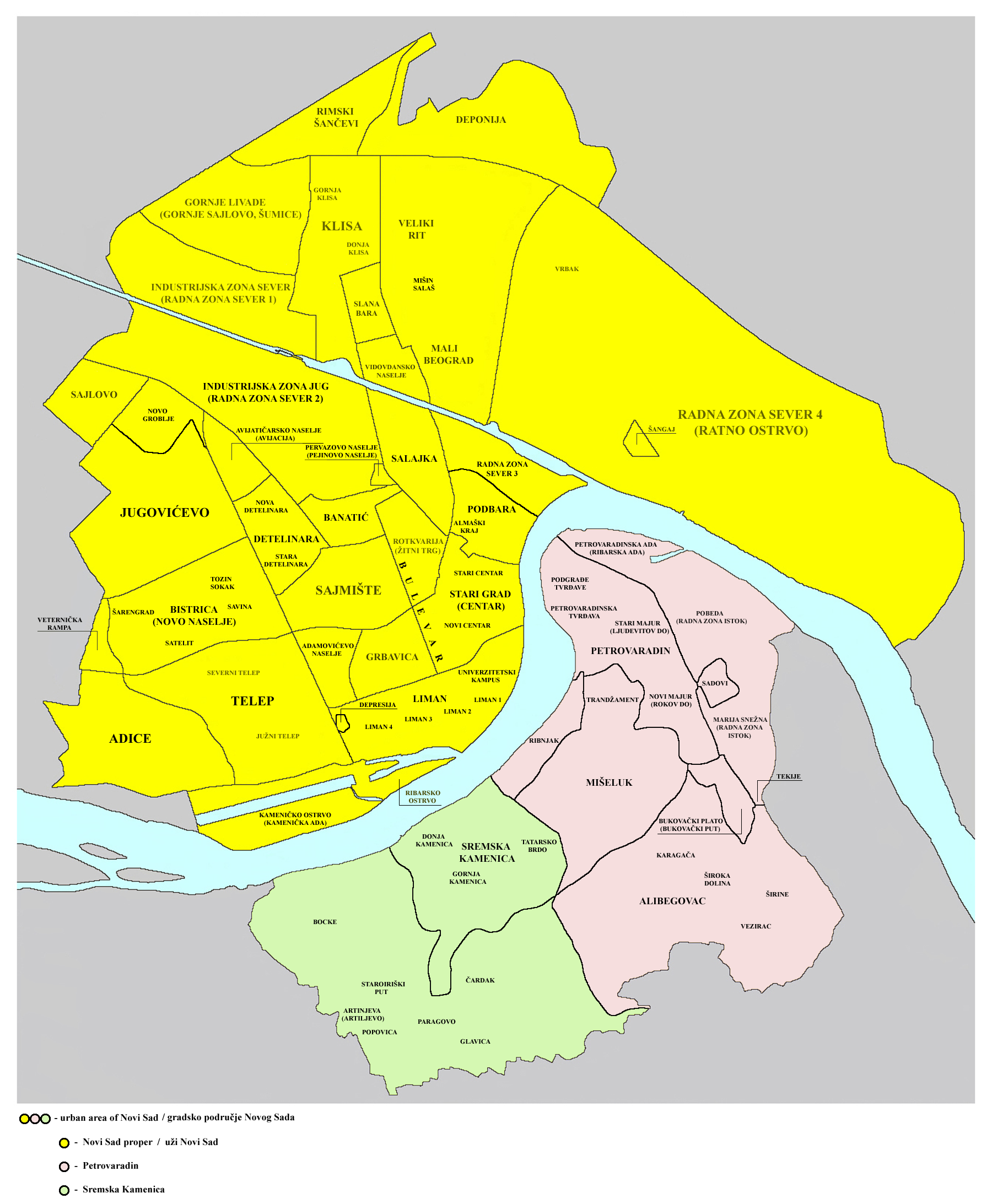
Map of the urban area of Novi Sad with city quarters

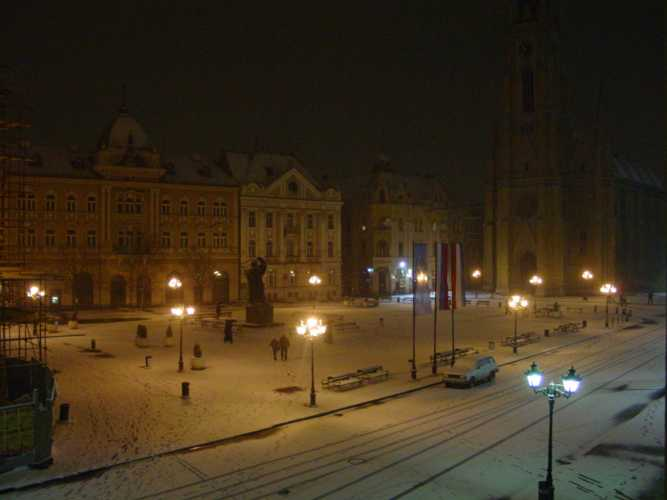
View of Stari Grad in winter

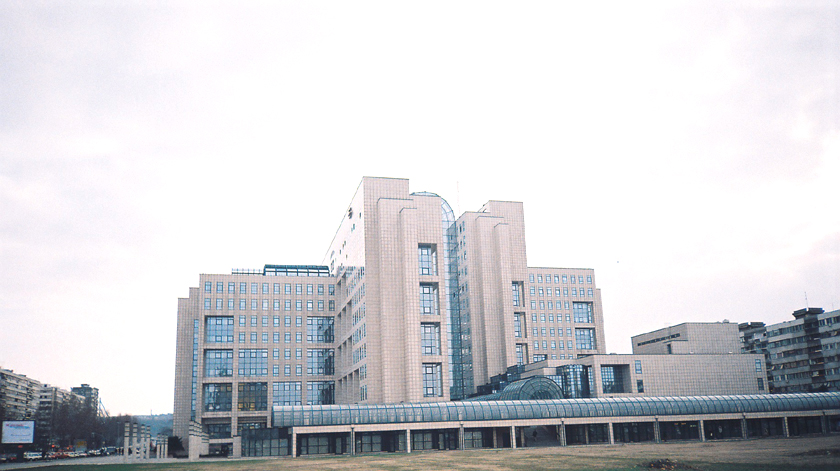
Liman 3, NIS-NAFTAGAS building

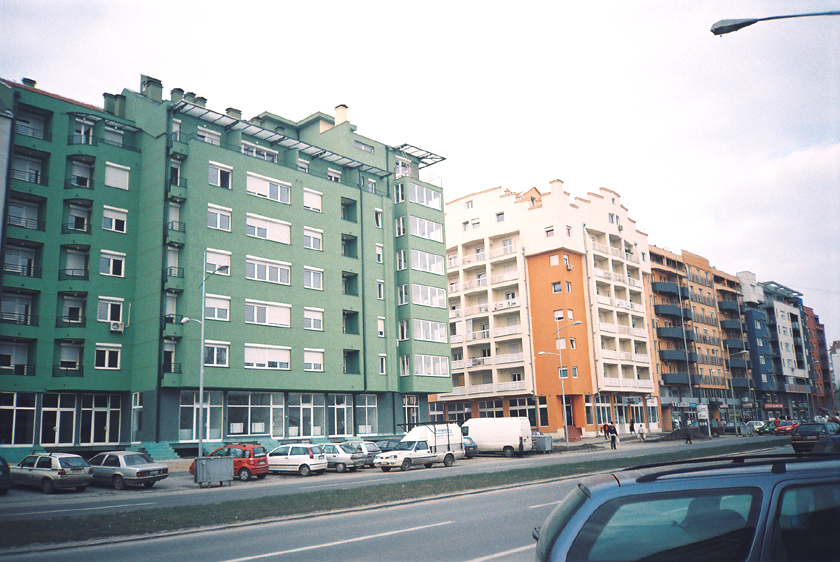
Grbavica

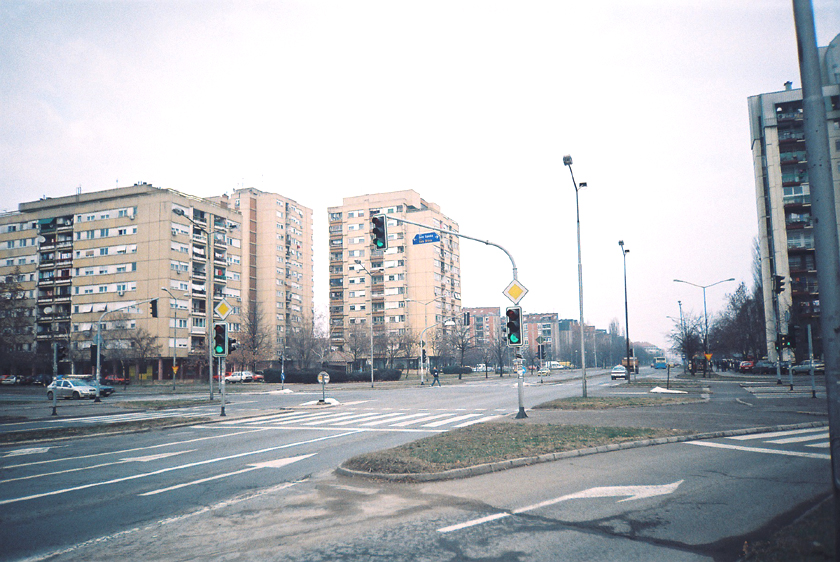
Bistrica (Novo Naselje)

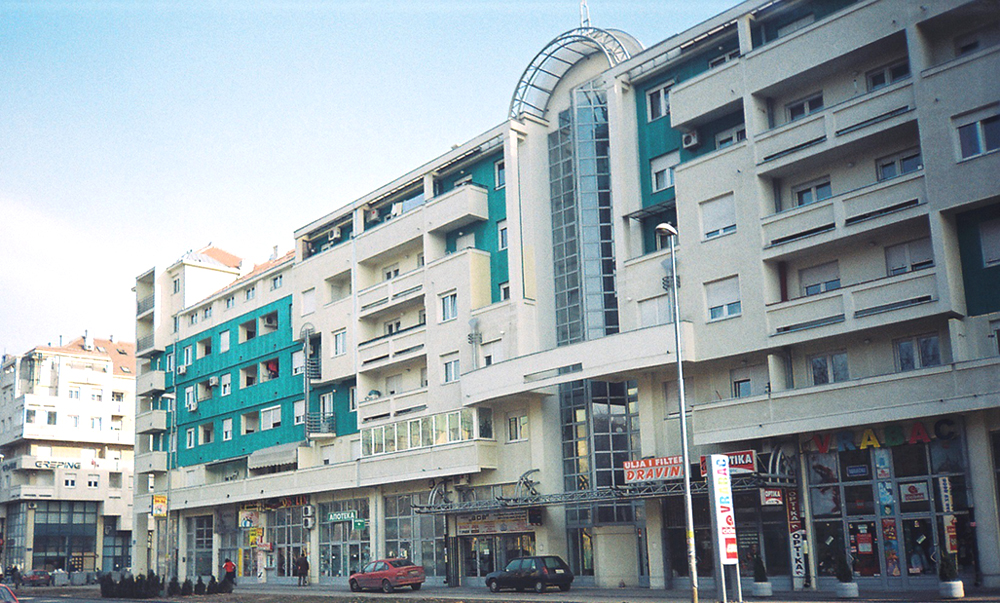
Detelinara

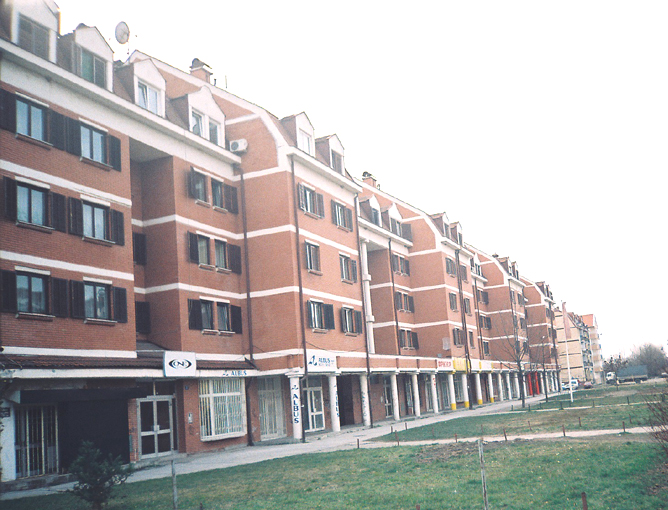
Telep

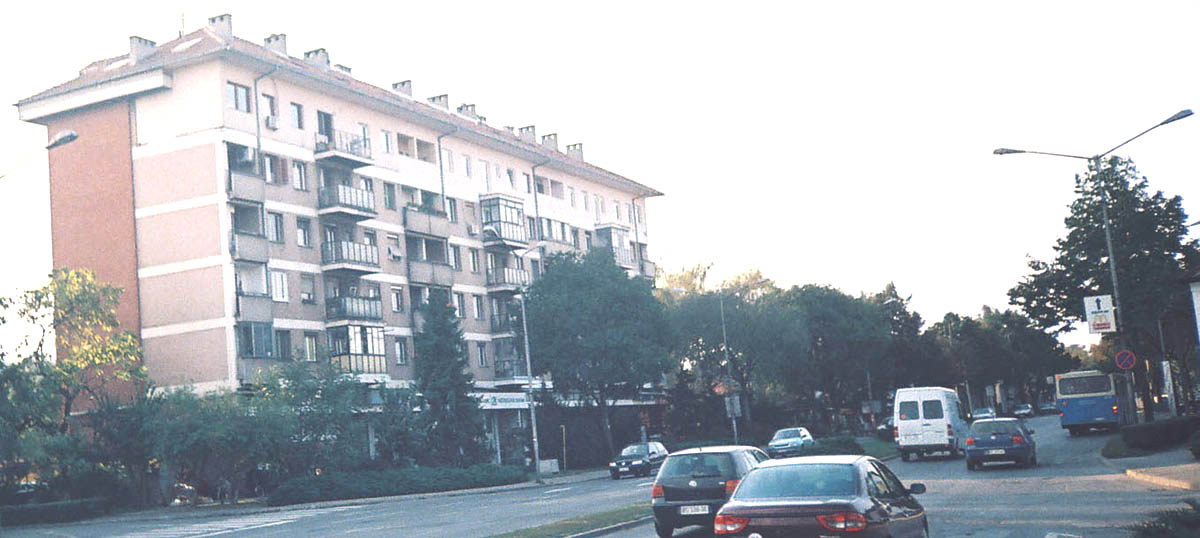
Petrovaradin

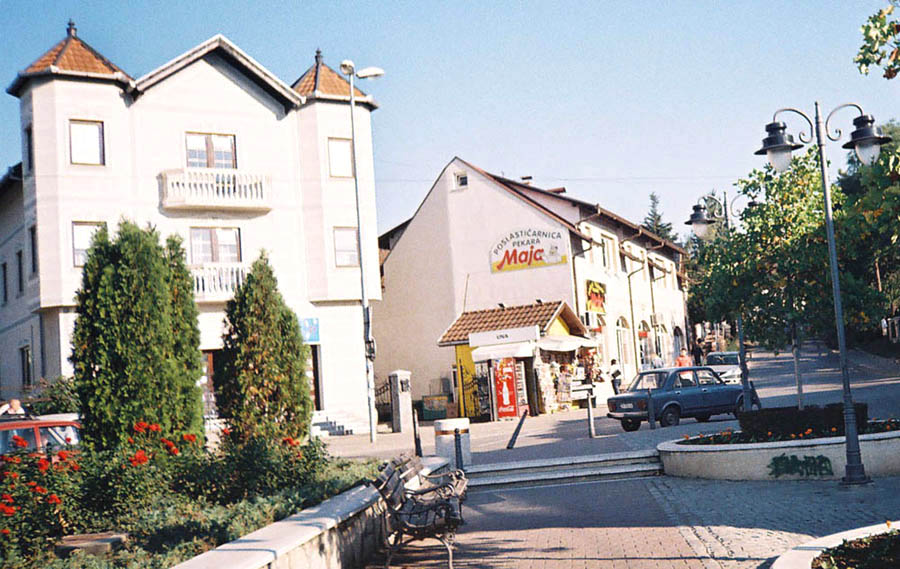
Sremska Kamenica

This is a list of the neighbourhoods and suburbs of Novi Sad.

== Neighbourhoods on the left bank of the Danube ==
- Stari Grad
- Liman (Liman I, Liman II, Liman III, Liman IV)
- Podbara
- Salajka
- Rotkvarija
- Banatić
- Sajmište
- Grbavica
- Adamovićevo Naselje
- Telep
- Novo naselje
- Klisa
- Detelinara
- Sajlovo
- Jugovićevo
- Šangaj
- Pervazovo naselje

== Neighbourhoods on the right bank of the Danube ==
- Petrovaradin
  - Petrovaradin Fortress (Petrovaradinska tvrđava)
  - Podgrađe Tvrđave (Gradić)

== Suburban settlements ==
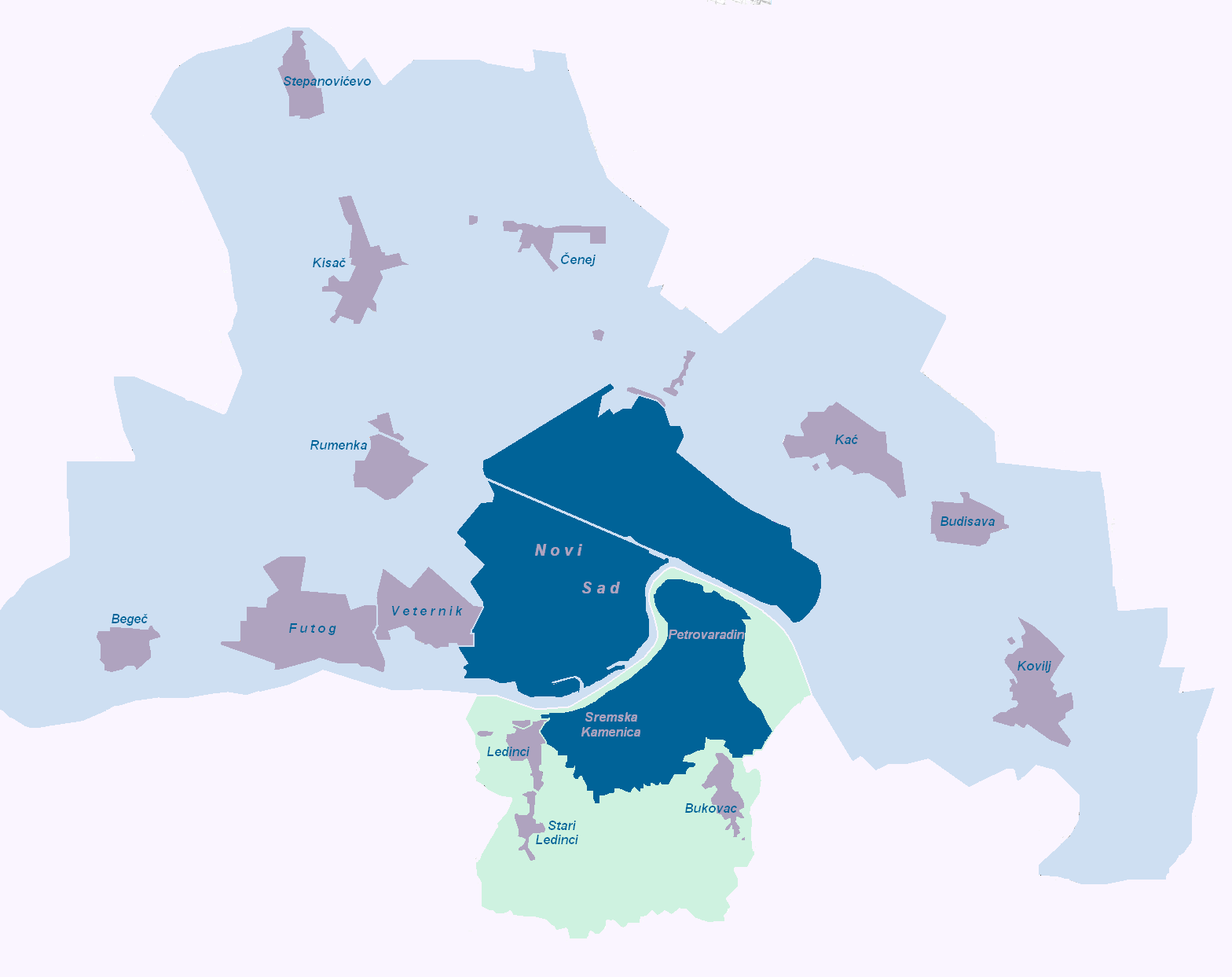
Surrounding suburban settlements of Novi Sad

- Begeč
- Budisava
- Bukovac
- Čenej
- Futog
- Kać
- Kisač
- Kovilj
- Ledinci
- Rumenka
- Stari Ledinci
- Stepanovićevo
- Veternik
- Sremska Kamenica

== See also ==
- Novi Sad
- Industrial zones in Novi Sad
- List of cities, towns and villages in Vojvodina
- List of places in Serbia
