= Šangaj =

Šangaj Шангај
- Urban neighborhood
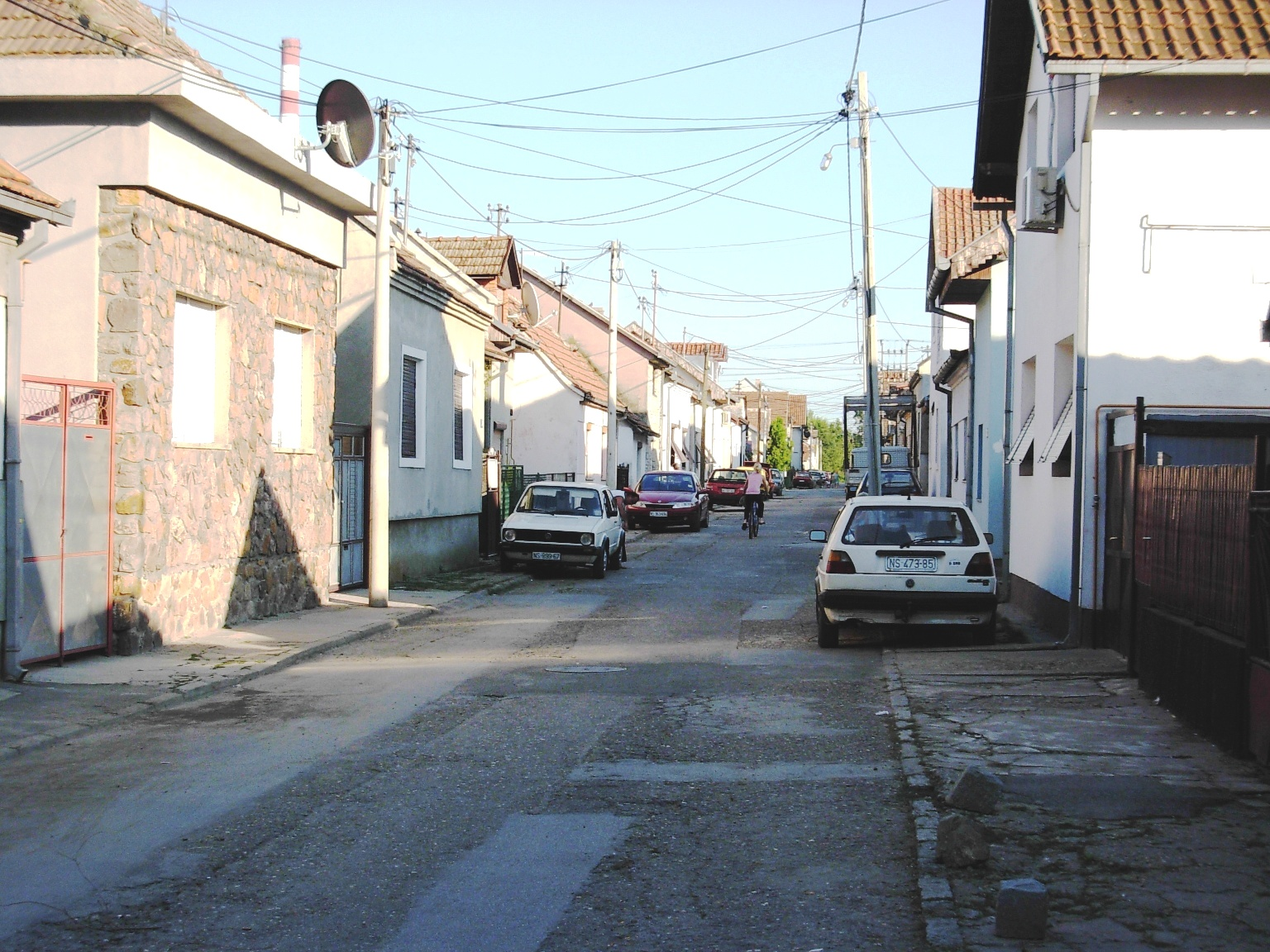
- 6th street in Šangaj, August 2010

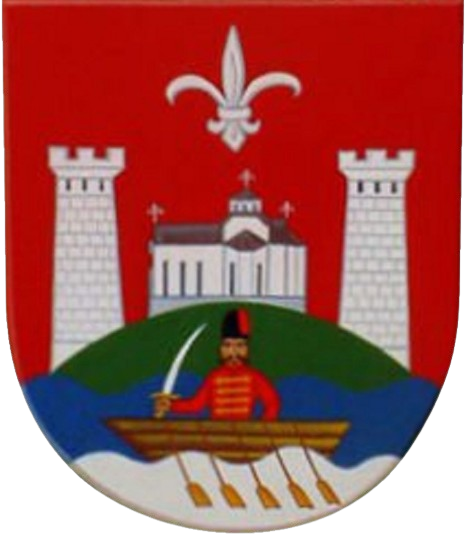
- Seal

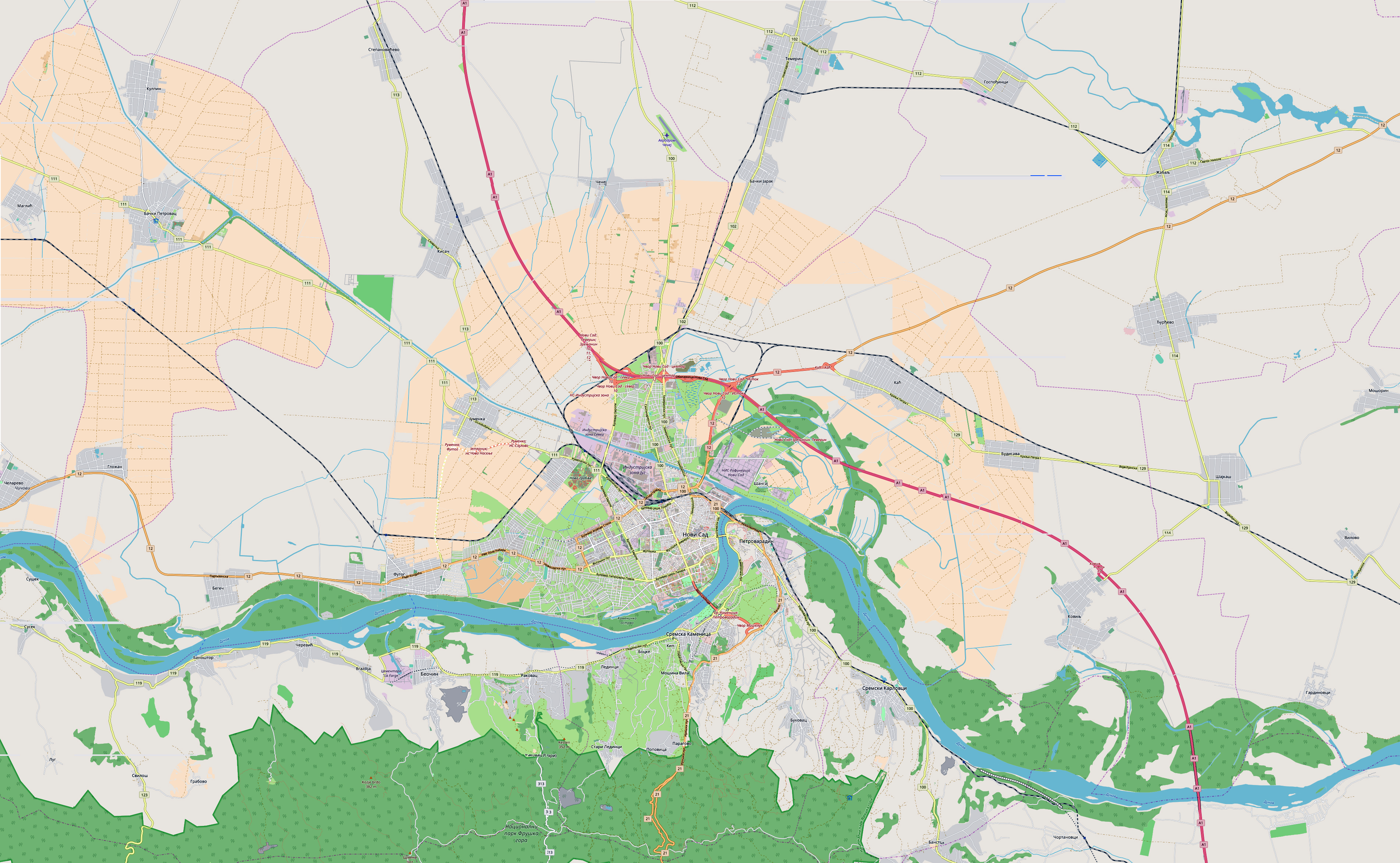
- Location within Novi Sad
- Coordinates: 45°16′19″N 19°52′33″E
- Country: Serbia
- Province: Vojvodina
- District: South Bačka
- Municipality: Novi Sad

Area
  - Total: 12.99 km^{2} (5.02 sq mi)
- Time zone: UTC+1 (CET)
  - Summer (DST): UTC+2 (CEST)
- Area code: +381(0)21
- Car plates: NS

Šangaj (Serbian Cyrillic: Шангај) is an urban neighborhood of the city of Novi Sad, Serbia. It is situated close to the Danube, and is surrounded by the Novi Sad industrial zones, right next to the oil refinery of Naftna Industrija Srbije. It covers an area of 0.13 km^{2}.

== Name ==
The old name of the area was Vrbak. In the Interwar period, the name of the settlement was Brančićevo Naselje ("Brančić's settlement"), named after Brančić, who was the owner of the Šangaj snack bar, the first building built there. "Šangaj" was later adopted as the official name. The name Šangaj itself is the Serbian transliteration for Shanghai, the largest city of the People's Republic of China.

== History ==
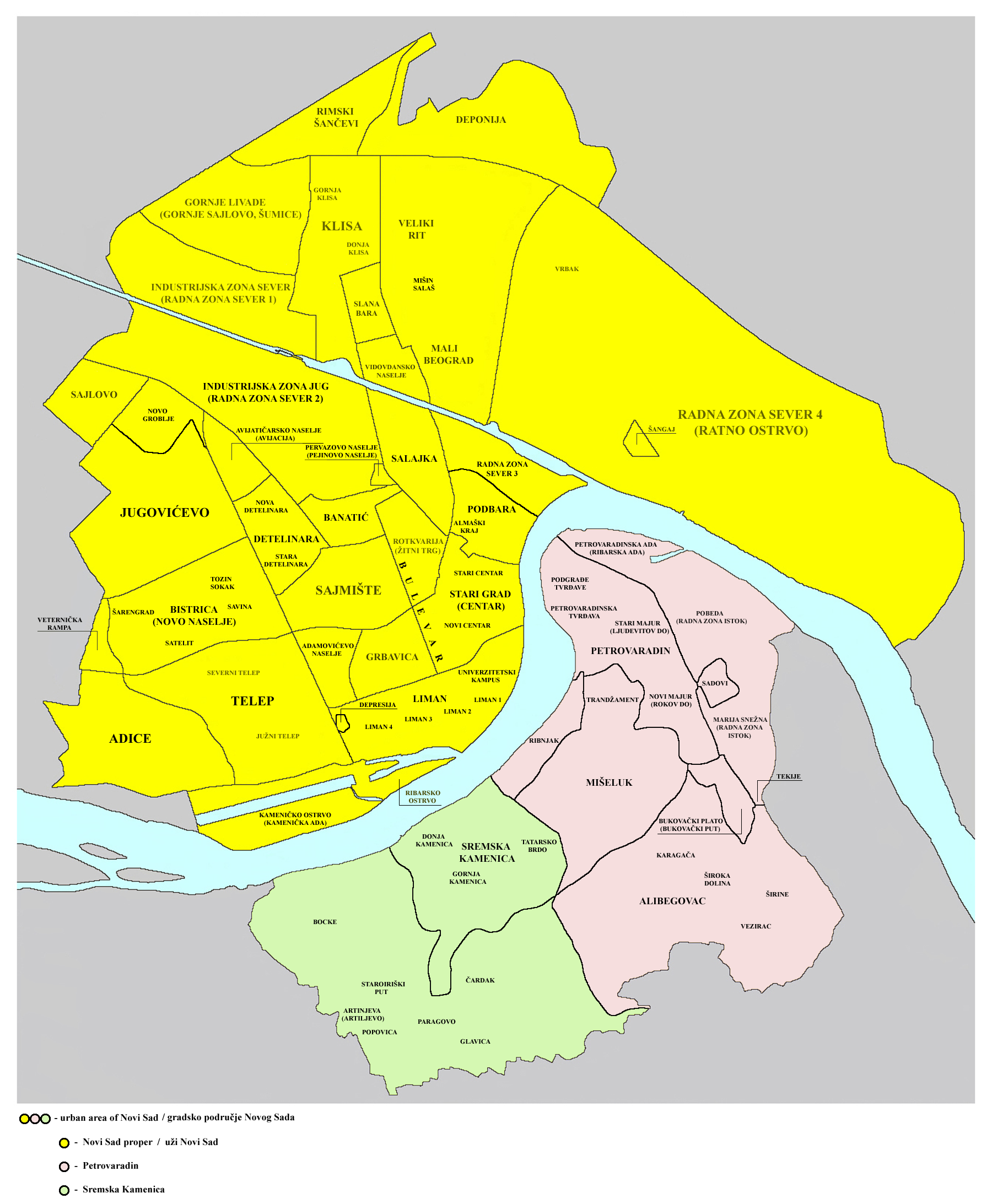
Map of the urban area of Novi Sad with city quarters, showing the location of Šangaj

From the 1980s, city authorities tried to relocate the neighborhood, due to high pollution of the nearby oil refinery.

Šangaj was located on the old road to Kać, which was closed in the early 1990s.

Devastated by NATO bombardment, during the Kosovo War of 1999, Šangaj was hit severely when oil refinery was bombed several times, causing severe pollution and widespread ecological damage (See: 1999 NATO bombing in Novi Sad).

== Population ==
In mid-2005, neighborhood had 1,827 inhabitants, according to the estimation from city's registry. The majority of the population were Serbs, while a smaller part of population are Romani. In mid-2010, neighborhood now have 2500 inhabitants, according to the estimation from city's registry. The majority of the population are now Serbs, while a smaller part of population are Romani.

== Transportation ==
Šangaj has only one road from and to the neighborhood, from Kaćki most ("Kać bridge") over Danube-Tisa-Danube Canal. Neighborhood is connected to the rest of the city by only one bus line, No. 21, from Banatić neighborhood.
