= Sajmište =

Sajmište can refer to:

- Sajmište (Novi Sad), a neighborhood of Novi Sad, Serbia
- Staro Sajmište, a neighborhood of Belgrade, Serbia
- Sajmište concentration camp, a concentration camp from World War II
