= Liman, Novi Sad =

Liman Лиман
- Urban neighborhood
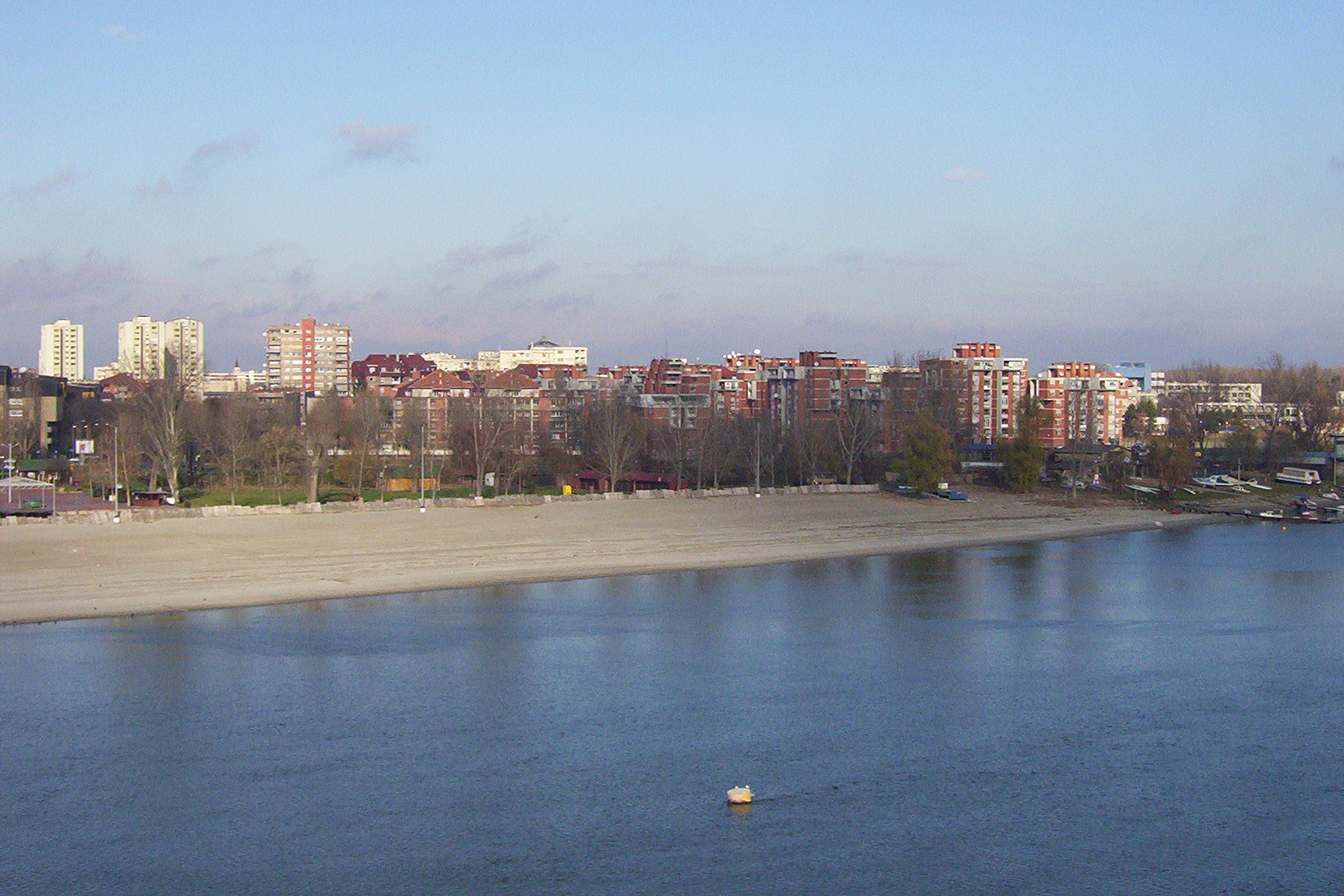
- Liman I and Štrand beach, view from Liberty Bridge
- Interactive map of Liman
- Coordinates: 45.2402°N 19.8302°E
- Country: Serbia
- Province: Vojvodina
- District: South Bačka
- City: Novi Sad

Area
  - Total: 3.98 km^{2} (1.54 sq mi)

Population (2025)
  - Total: 28,556
  - Density: 7,170/km^{2} (18,600/sq mi)
- Time zone: UTC+1 (CET)
  - Summer (DST): UTC+2 (CEST)
- Area code: +381(0)21
- Car plates: NS

Liman (Serbian Cyrillic: Лиман) is an urban neighborhood of the city of Novi Sad, Serbia. It is located to the south of the city centre, along the Danube river, covering an area of 3.98 km^{2}. It is a relatively new part of the city, built between 1960s and 1990s on what previously were marshes. It is divided into four parts, numbered by Roman numerals: Liman I (with University campus), II, III and IV, which match the chronology of its development.

== Location ==
=== Borders ===
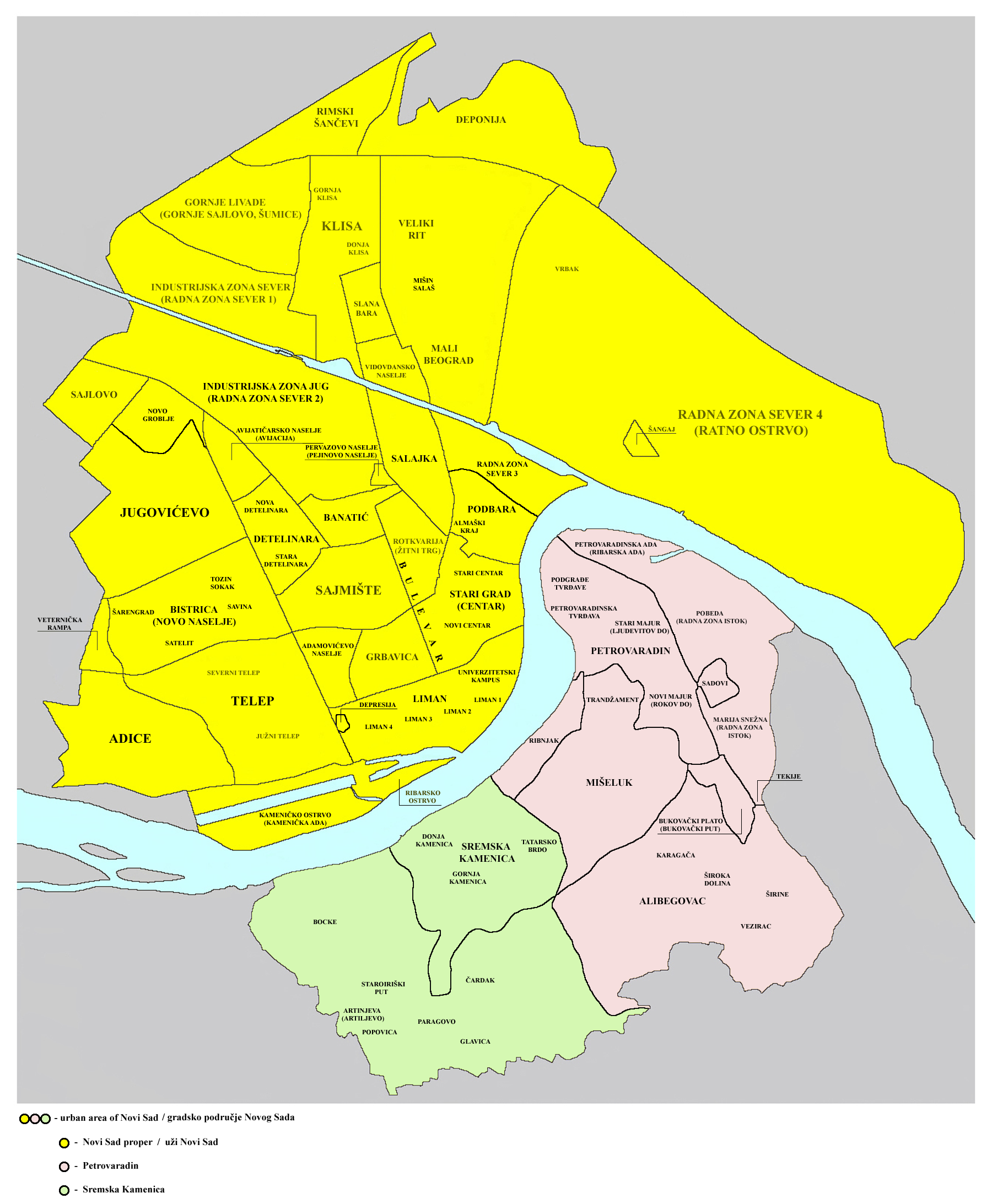
Map of the urban area of Novi Sad with city quarters, showing the location of Liman

The northern border of Liman is Bulevar Cara Lazara (Tsar Lazar Boulevard), the western borders are Ulica Ribarsko ostrvo (Ribarsko ostrvo Street) and Ulica Sima Matavulja (Simo Matavulj Street), while the southern and eastern border is the Danube (i.e. Sunčani kej - "The Sunny Quay").

The neighbouring neighbourhoods are: Telep in the west, Adamovićevo Naselje, Grbavica and Stari Grad in the north, and Ribarsko ostrvo (not a settlement, but tourist destination) in the south. In the south-east of the settlement is the Danube.

=== Parts of the neighborhood ===
Liman consists of four parts:

- Liman I with University campus, between the Sunny Quay and Fruškogorska Street;
- Liman II, between Fruškogorska Street and Liberation Boulevard;
- Liman III, between Liberation Boulevard and Balzakova Street; and
- Liman IV, between Balzakova Street in the east and Ribarsko ostrvo Street and Simo Matavulj Street in the west.
- Depresija, between Iva Andrića Street in the east and Sima Matavulja in the west. Depression originated as a temporary worker's neighborhood and is often considered part of Liman IV. This location is intended for the creation of the future Liman V.

== History ==
=== Etymology ===
The origin of the word Liman comes from Ancient Greek (λιμένας), which means bay or harbour. With the expansion of the Ottoman Empire to the western and northern shores of the Black Sea, the word spread by the Turks to eventually enter the Bulgarian, Romanian, Ukrainian, Russian and Serbian language vocabularies. The word Liman denotes places in the river flow with a peaceful flow, where the water appears to be standing, usually formed where gravel has been extracted, or places where the river maelstrom follows the bottom of the river bed. In Serbian areas, the word denoted lakes and ponds, with sandbanks, formed in the bays of the Danube.

=== Little and Great Limans ===
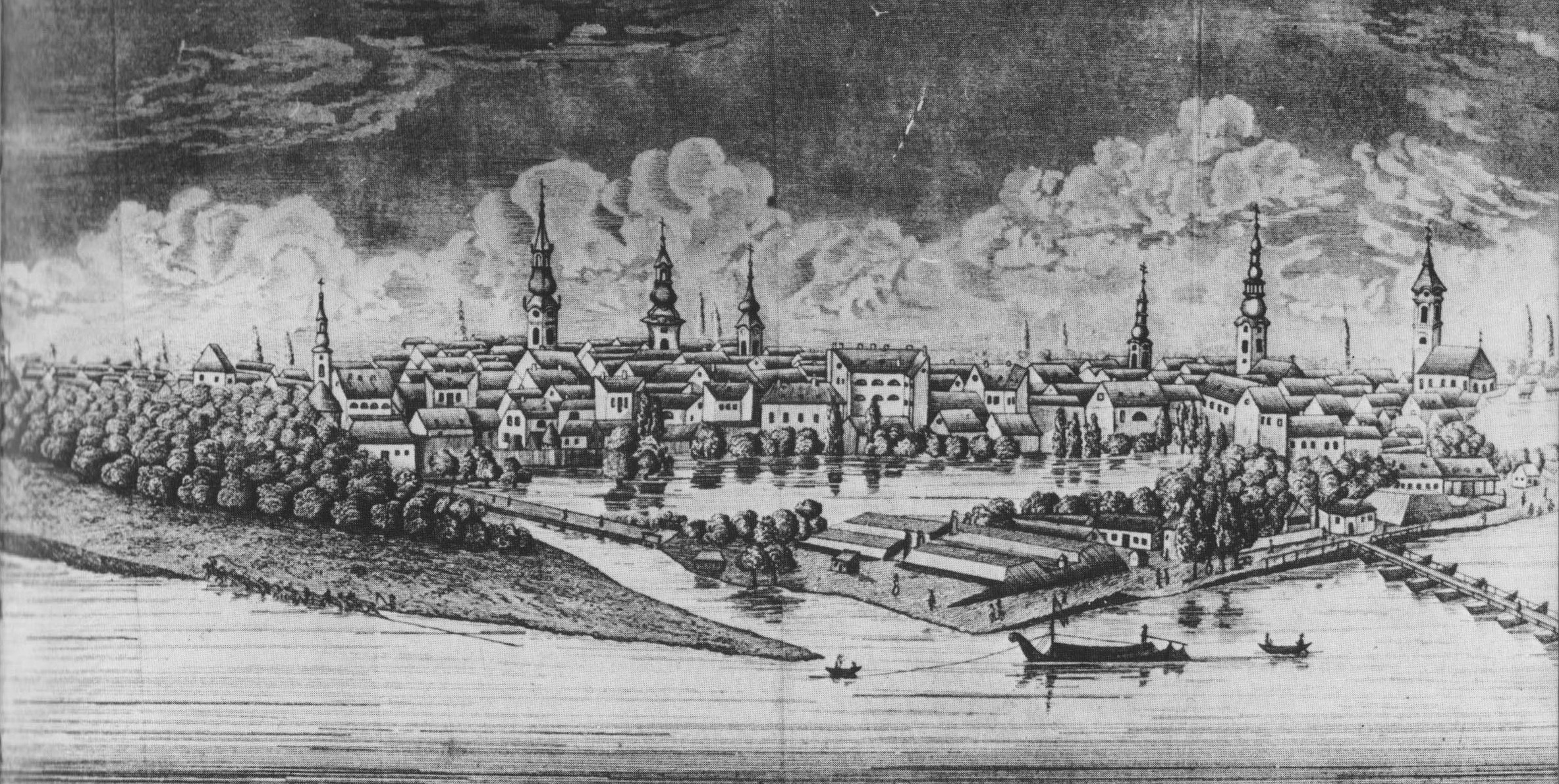
Novi Sad with Little and Great Liman, 19th century

In the past of Novi Sad there were "Mali" (Little) and "Veliki" (Great) Liman. Little Liman was in the area of today’s city centre (Stari Grad), and until the early 1930s there were ponds, sandy beds, water plants, willow trees and meadows. This Liman covered today's Danube Park and the area along the Danube to the former railway embankment, under which were the underpasses as a transport link to the Great Liman. The premises of Little Liman were framed by the Danube, Dunavska Street, Zmaj Jovina Street, Kralja Aleksandra Street and the railway embankment (today’s Tsar Lazar Boulevard).

According to the data from 1764, the terrain on which the territory of today's Liman is located was part of Great Liman. It started from the Futog forests and extended all the way to the streets of Aleksa Santić, Lasla Gala and the railway (on present-day Grbavica and Stari Grad). It extended all the way to Narodnih heroja Street at Mihajla Pupina Boulevard. According to 19th century records, in front of the Catholic Cemetery (in present-day Grbavica) was the town promenade "Šištat".

=== First Novi Sad railway station ===
The construction of the Budapest-Subotica-Novi Sad-Zemun-Belgrade railway began in 1881, and a railway embankment was erected on one part of the Greater Liman, with stretching across the entire length of today's Cara Lazara Boulevard. The railroad crossed through the then existing bridge built at that time and was passing through a tunnel under the Fortress. Defensive levees towards the Danube were built at that time. The building of the railway station, erected in 1882, was built on the present premises of Grbavica, between Vere Pavlović Street, Pushkin Street and the Boulevard Tsar Lazar Boulevard.

With the dismantling of the southern city railway connections (moving the railway station from Liman to Jaše Tomića Boulevard in Salajka and Podbara neighborhoods) that started in 1964, the old railways station building was demolished. Today a relief plaque of the God Mercury, which used to be part of the façade of the station, is in front of the post office in Grbavica and next to the Liman green market and is the last remnant of the former station.

=== Constructions of the 1920s-1950s ===
The rejuvenation of Liman began in 1922. In the area behind the railway embankment, the city administration of the inter-war period gave cheap land area for housing construction. These were mostly one story houses with spacious courtyards and gardens. Citizens were supplied with water from several public water wells. There was no sewage, and the danger from groundwater was constant. Despite these troubles, the settlement was expanding, and the population reached about 2,600. The main thoroughfare in the settlement was Fruškogorska Street, which leads to Štrand, a newly made city beach at the time.

From 1924 to 1937, a small train called Trčika passed through Fruškogorska Street during the summer season. On this part of Liman, more industrial facilities have been built.

With World War II and the start of the People's Liberation Struggle (1941), in addition to attempts to blow up the military garage and the gasoline depot, the most successful diversion on Liman near the railway station was on September 11, when 124 telephone and signal cables were cut and a pump to supply steam locomotives with water was disabled.

After World War II, plans for further developing the Liman area expanded. As early as 1945, the terrain began to be sanded, and then by 1955, pipes and rods were placed deep in the sand to ensure the stability of the buildings.

=== Constructions of the 1960s-1990s ===
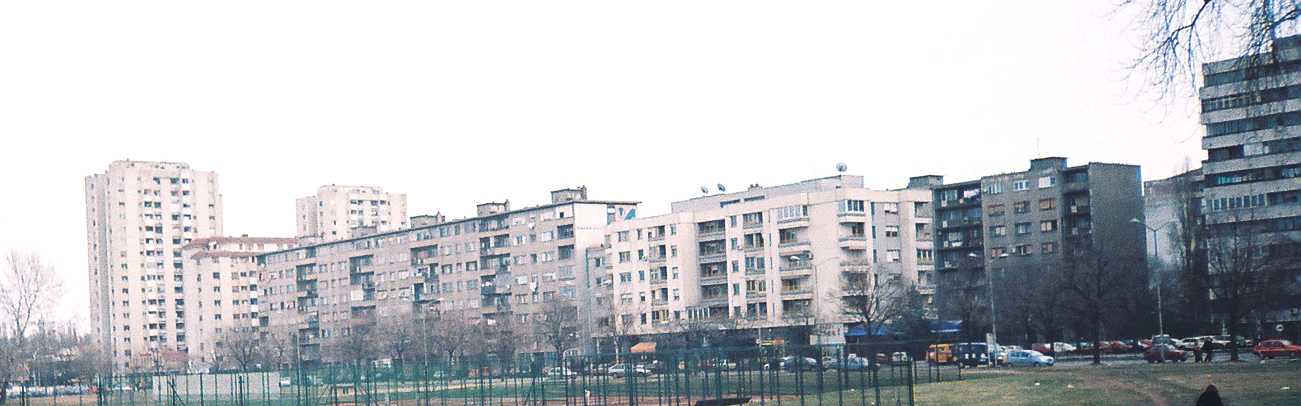
Liman II, Tsar Lazar Boulevard

Construction of new multi-storey buildings of Liman began in the early 1960s, and the settlement continued to be built in several stages chronologically (Liman 2, Liman 3, Liman 4).

Liman I with University campus was started first; and Liman IV was still being built up towards the end of the 1990s. The university town was built in the eastern area of the former Great Liman and residential buildings with accompanying facilities and corresponding infrastructure were erected.

=== Constructions of the 2000s-onward ===
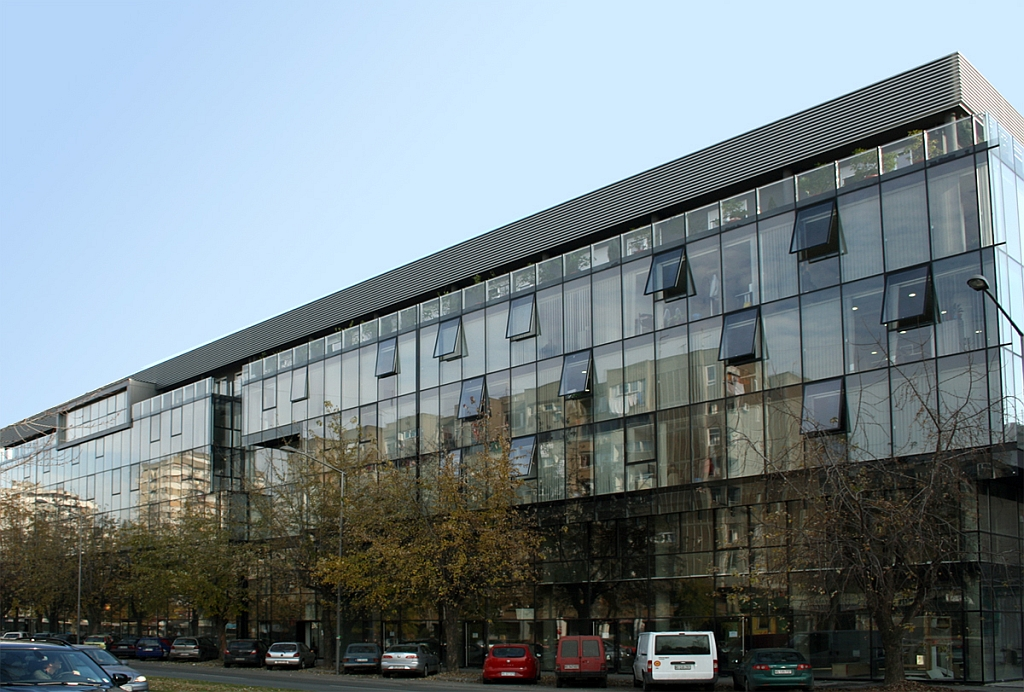
Office building complex in Liman III

After the economic crisis and sanctions of the 1990s and with most of the neighborhood area filled in with existing commercial and residential buildings, constructions in Liman slowed down, with only few notable constructions and reconstructions occurring during the period between the 2000s and 2010s.

By the General Urban Plan of Novi Sad for 2030, the remaining empty land areas in Depresija neighborhood are planned to be filled with new apartment blocks, regular and sports parks, commercial and business buildings. The remained of the houses located in the Depresija area are planned to be demolished to make room for Liman V neighborhood and its apartment buildings as well as the planned bridge going through the neighborhood from Subotica Boulevard (Europe Boulevard) to Sremska Kamenica neighborhood. A new residential area, inspired by the Belgrade Waterfront, is planned in the area of the former city shipyard as well as the current location of the river navy. Further revitalisation of the former Chinatown (industrial zone; former silk factory buildings) is planned, with an area left for the construction of a memorial center for the victims of the Novi Sad raid. Plans exist for a pedestrian and cycling bridge on the foundations of the old railway bridge (from Cara Lazara Boulevard through the tunnel in Petrovaradin Fortress). Plans exist to expand the Štrand beach downstream and refurbish the beach area with more entertainment options and accommodations, moving the rowing club "Danubius 1855", kayak canoe club "Vojvodina" and the restaurant "Cesla" to Kamenička Ada upstream. SKCNS Factory is a planned multifunctional city concert hall that was under construction since 2017, located in the University campus area.

== Population ==
In mid-2005 estimation by city's registry Liman had 34,234 inhabitants, including:

- Liman I (with university campus) 4,683;
- Liman II 7,560;
- Liman III 12,418; and
- Liman IV 9,573 inhabitants.

Since 2022, Liman in total has about 29,500 residents registered in their five local communities: "Liman" with 4,040; "Boško Buha" with 6,241; "Liman III" with 10,853; "Ostrvo" with 4,769; "Ivo Andrić" with 3,583.

== Local communities ==
Liman is part of Novi Sad municipality, and it is divided into five local communities:

- Liman, located in Drage Spasić 1;
- Boško Buha, located in Fruškogorska 8;
- Liman III, located in People's Front 46;
- Ostrvo, located in People's Front 71;
- Ivo Andrić, located in Banović Strahinje 20.

Between 1980 and 1989, Liman was one of the seven municipalities of Novi Sad City. The municipality included part of the neighborhood of Liman, as well as neighborhoods of Grbavica, Adamovićevo Naselje and Ribarsko ostrvo.

== Culture ==
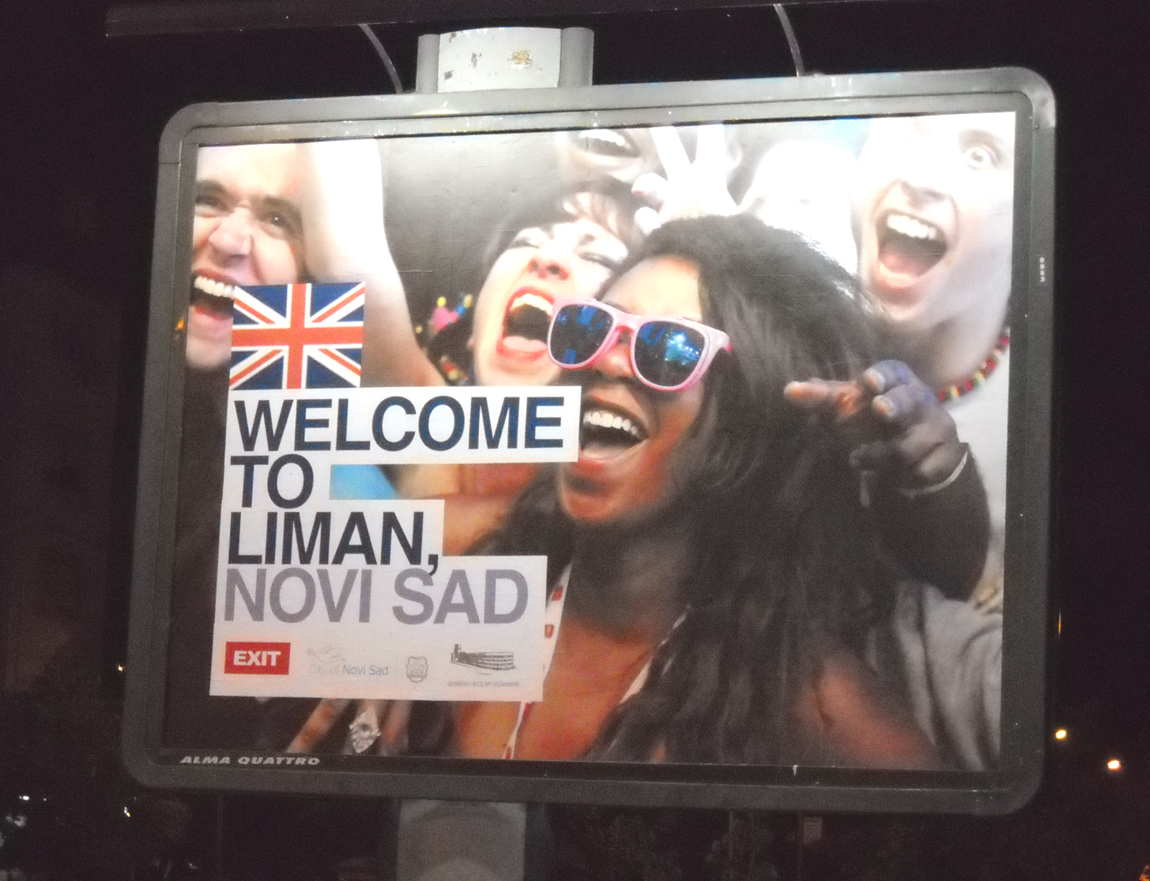
"Welcome to Liman" sign for the 2010 Exit festival

As one of the largest and the most populated urban areas of the city, Liman sports numerous festivals and cultural events, countless groups and organizations, as well as cultural centers. While the neighborhood currently has no church (only a chapel in the location of the river navy), there are plans for one in the future.

The "Novosadska biciklistička inicijativa" (Novi Sad Cycling Initiative), formed in 18 September 2011 by Liman residence, would hold an annual bicycle rally called "Novosadska Kritična masa" (Novi Sad Critical Mass). The bicycle rally paths would often go through or at the edges of Liman neighborhoods, allowing locals from all walks of life and age ranges to participate in the event. The rally and other such bike related events are done for the goal of the promotion and development of urban cycling, as well as promoting and educating a culture of safe traffic and tolerance among road users.

Since 2018, an annual Chinese Lantern Festival is held in Liman Park from late January to early February to celebrate the Chinese New Year, showcasing a wide variety of lantern designs with Chinese cultural and mythological motifs.

In 2019, Novi Sad became the European Youth Capital. Most of the student events were coordinated from the newly restored Chinatown area. The area was also used for cultural events during 2022, when Novi Sad also became the European Capital of Culture.

=== Cuisine ===
The neighborhood has numerous privately owned bakeries, restaurants, and cafes, showcasing typical Serbian and international food and drinks.

The gastronomy festival "Ukusi Vojvodine" (Tastes of Vojvodina; TONS - Tastes of Novi Sad) is a multi-layered event that presents small producers of food and beverages from all over Vojvodina, as well as restaurants where traditional Vojvodina cuisine is cherished. The event exists since 2016 and is held in Liman Park around the first or second weekend of September.

== Economy ==
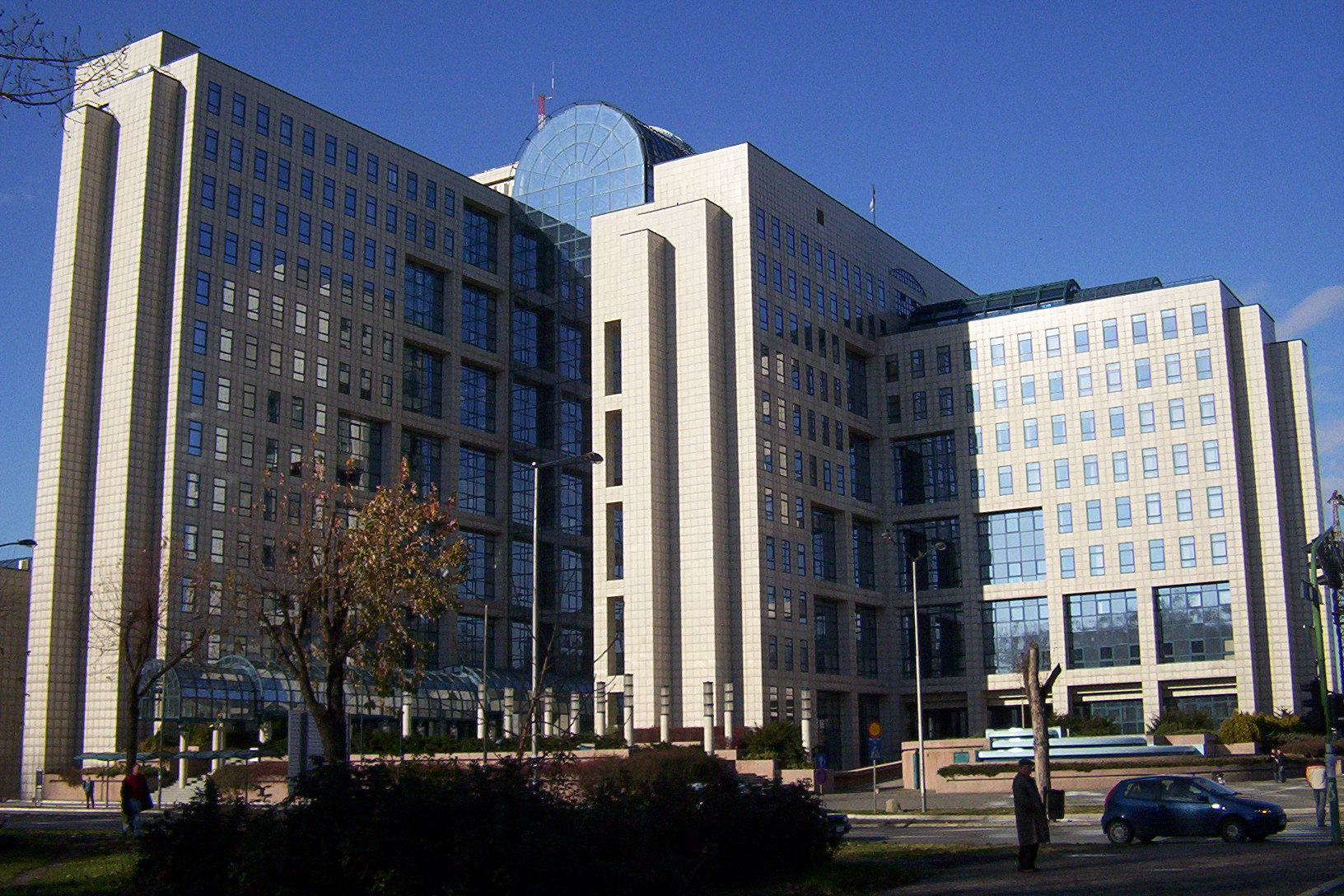
NIS building, headquarters of Naftna Industrija Srbije, Liman III

Liman, just as many neighborhoods in Novi Sad, has commercial areas integrated with residential areas such as: small business centers, banks, trade and craft shops, supermarkets, etc. Most Liman residence also use the commercial areas at the very edge of Grbavica, Adamovićevo Naselje, Stari Grad, Telep neighborhoods.

The headquarters of Naftna Industrija Srbije (Oil Industry of Serbia) and "Agrovojvodina" are all located in Liman III.

=== Factories ===
Historically, there were several factory zones located in the Liman area, all slowly closed and dismantled with the further development of the neighborhood. The area known as "Kineska četvrt" (Chinatown) was the location of a former silk factory. The old shipyard is located between Liman and Fisherman Island.

=== Markets ===
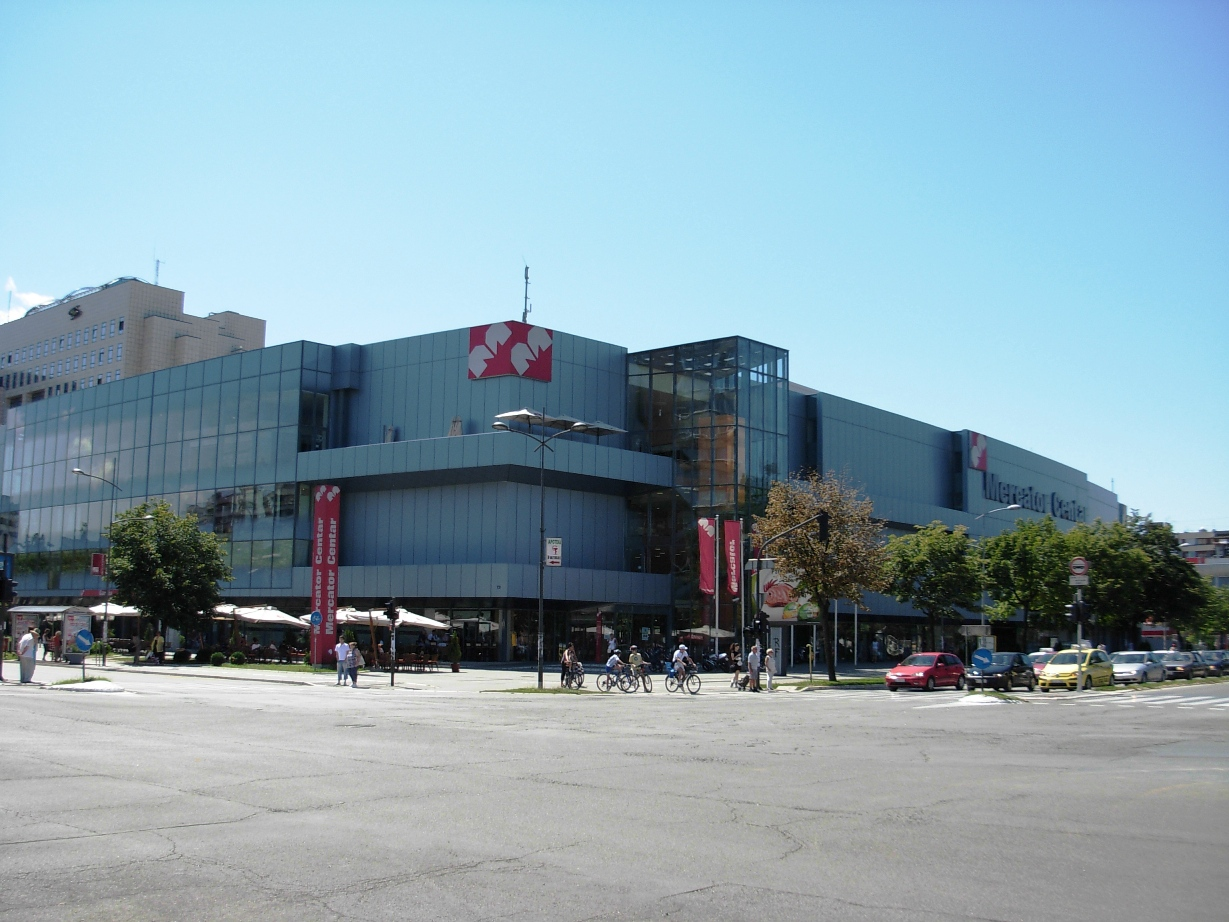
Mercator Centar, Liman III

Liman has several supermarkets located within or at the very outskirts of the neighborhood (part of other neighborhoods but used by Liman residence due to their vicinity):

- "Mercator",
- "Maxi",
- "Idea",
- "Univerexport",
- "Lidl".

Liman also has a green market, "Liman". The "Promenada" shopping center (located at the very outskirts of the Stari Grad neighborhood next to Liman, in the area of former tennis and football fields) is a popular shopping destination in the city.

=== Transportation ===
Historically, the first Novi Sad railway station existed the area of modern day Liman and Grbavica. The Budapest-Zemun railway connection started in 1883, when the first train arrived in Novi Sad. Since 1901, an omnibus (horse-drawn tram) has been used to carry passengers from the railway station to the city centre, and since 1911 an electric tram, which was replaced by a bus service in 1958.

Bus lines 1, 4, 7, 8, 9, 11А, 11B, 12, 13, 68, 70, 71, 72, 73 and 74 connect this neighborhood with other major city neighborhoods, as well as some surrounding settlements.

The neighborhood has cycling infrastructure, with larger boulevards and streets having segregated cycling roads from pedestrian pathways. Bike racks are located in front of most major public and commercial buildings. Since 2014 with the "Vratimo Novi Sad Biciklistima" initiative (which started in Novi Sad in 2009), NS bike, a local bike renting service company, has its own bike rack area at the end of Fruškogorska Street near the city beach. The renting service is available from the start of the cycling season in April and ends in December.

While taxi companies function throughout the city, there are several taxi ranks in the neighborhood, such as the ones at Fruškogorska Street near the Štrand entrance (with 13 taxi parking spaces), Zone in the People's Front and Balzakova Streets (with 18 taxi parking spaces), and at Student dorm A (with 4 taxi parking spaces).

Notable Liman streets are: Balzakova Street, Despota Stefana Boulevard, Liberation Boulevard, Cara Lazara Boulevard, Narodnog fronta Street, Iva Andrića Street, Fruškogorska Street, Shakespeare's Street, etc.

== Society ==
=== Education ===
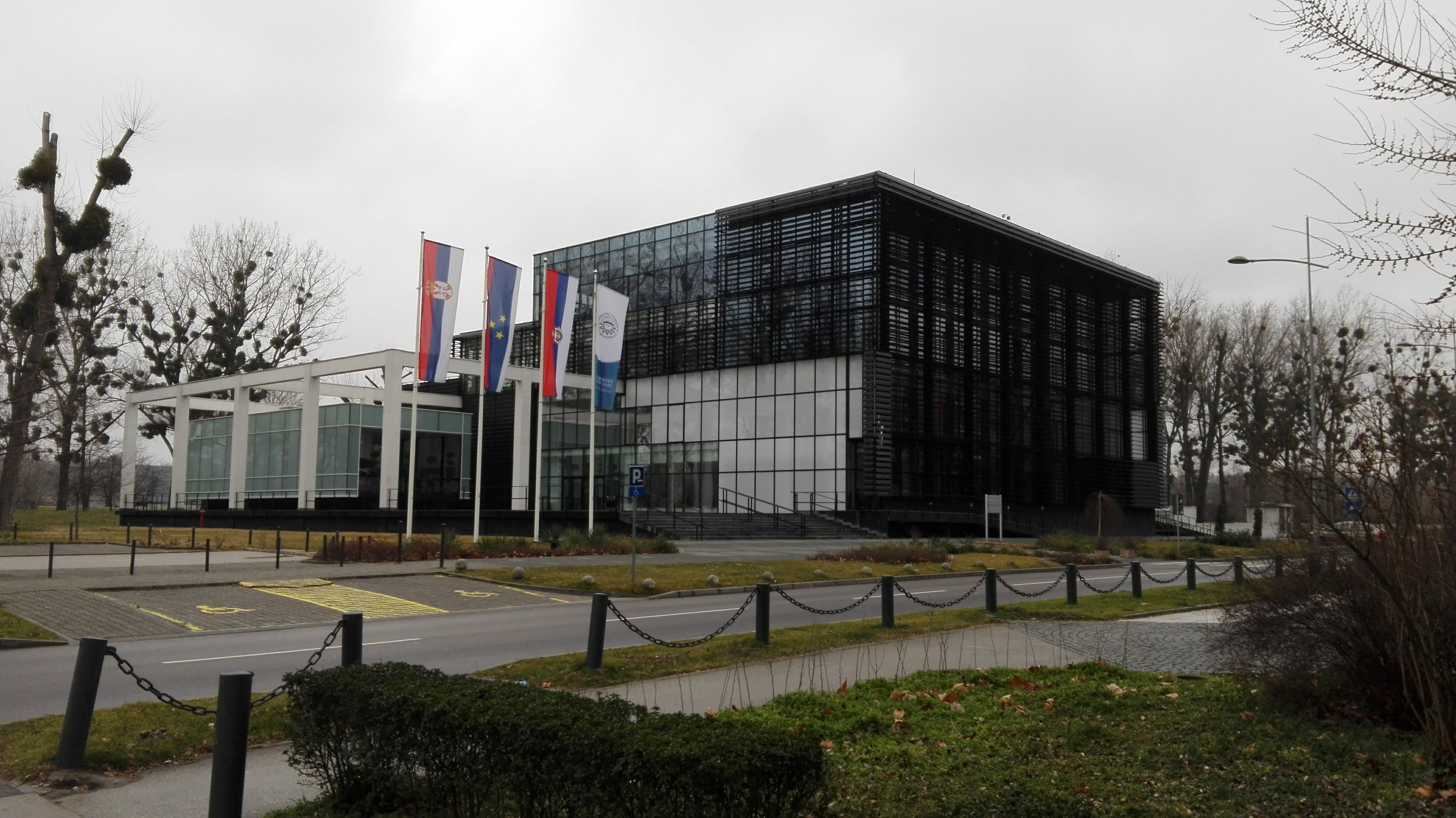
University of Novi Sad, Liman I

There are two primary schools. "Jovan Popović" (built in 1972) located in Liman II, and "Žarko Zrenjanin" (built in 1950) located in Liman III.

The music school of "Isidor Bajić" (founded in 1909) moved from its old building in Stražilovska Street in Star Grad neighborhood to its new building (built in 2011) at Cara Lazara Boulevard along with the ballet school of Novi Sad (founded in 1947) where they share the same building. One of the schools concert halls are also used by the city during cultural events.

The Liman neighborhoods also have several public and private kindergartens.

Within Liman 1 is the University City (Student City) of the University of Novi Sad with the Rectory and Faculties of Technical Sciences, Agriculture, Philosophy, Law, Natural Sciences & Mathematics, Technological and Economics, as well as the Higher Economic-Commercial School. The university city also includes the Faculty of Sport & Physical Education, located on the north side of Cara Lazara Boulevard in Star Grad. The western part of the university campus consists of student dormitories, an assistant home, a student health facility, student co-operatives, restaurants and a supply center, with a mixed-goods shop, a bookstore and other necessary facilities. No university city in the country has such a complex campus in one place. Some buildings of the university complex (student dormitories) are also on Liman 3. Liman I was started as a housing project for professors of the University of Novi Sad.

=== Health ===
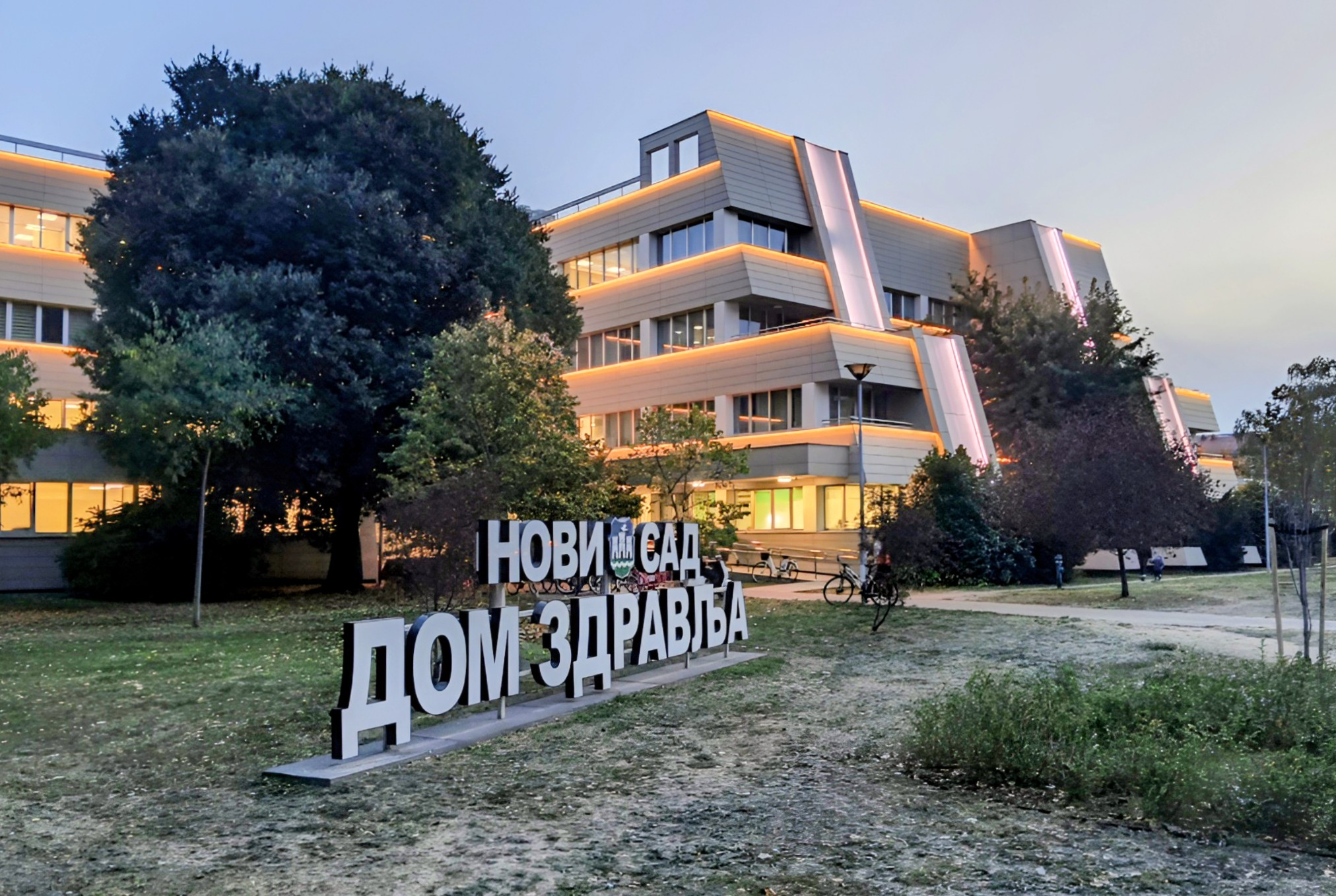
"Dom zdravlja" (Community health centre) in Liman IV

The community health center "Novi Sad" is the main health center for the Liman neighborhoods. It is also the largest community health center in the city.

The neighborhoods also have several private medical clinics and dentists.

=== Sports ===
In Liman there the University Sports Centre Đačko Igralište (Student Playground) (founded in 1936), the port for smaller boats, the Vojvodina kayak canoe club (founded in 1947), as well as the Danubius rowing club (founded in 1885).

At Liman II there are two playing fields for FK Kabel, while at the Student Playground in Liman I there is the football club Index.

=== Recreation ===
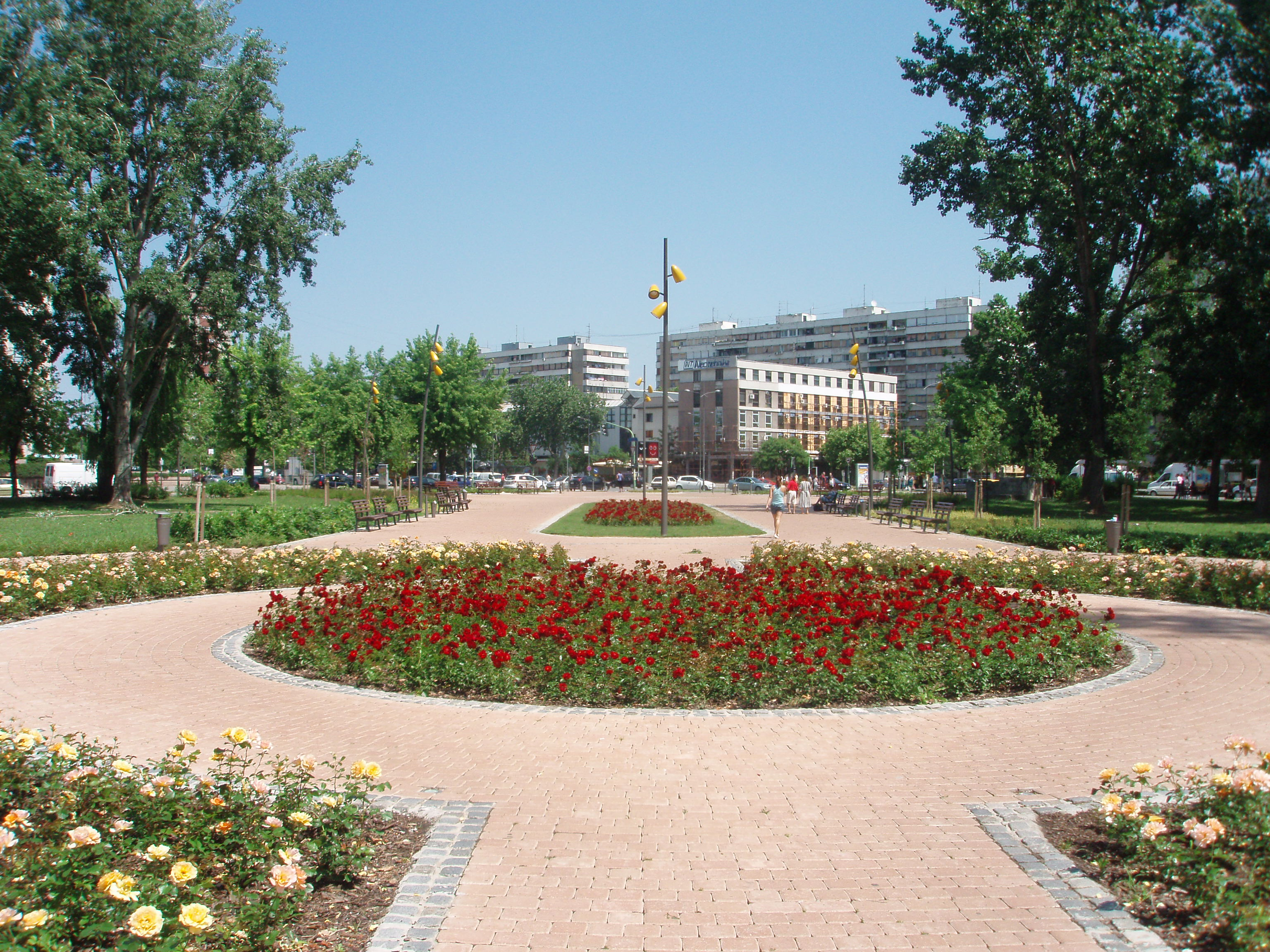
Liman Park, Liman III

Due to the proximity of the Danube river, as well as the socialist planned construction of the settlement, Liman has a large number of areas for rest and recreation, with large public green spaces between residential buildings. Of the parks and green areas of significance are: the Liman Park, the University Park, and the "Sunčani kej" (Sunny Quay).

Liman Park is the second largest park in the city (after Kamenica Park) and sports several features such as: flag park (erected during the 2022 European Capital of Culture season), skate park, boules terrain, table tennis area, basketball court, open public gym, dog park, children’s playground, a public drinking fountain, and the headquarters of the city greenery (Gradsko Zelenilo).

University Park served for a time as a camp for the EXIT festival.

Sunny Quay is popular for pedestrians and cyclists, for both leisure and exercise. It stretches from Podbara to Liman III.

In the Liman part of the Danube lies the city’s most popular beach, Štrand (founded in 1911), as well as the smaller wilder beach "Bećarac".

To the south of Liman is the picnic and recreation zone of "Ribarac" (Fishermen Island), where the Danube lagoon "Šodroš" is used as a rowing and sailing path, and anchorage of river vessels.

=== Military ===
The southwestern area of Liman is the location of the river navy. The area is also used for people doing their voluntary military service. The area has a small church chapel dedicated to Saint Stefan (currently the only religious building in the entirety of Liman neighborhood) for the soldiers stationed there.

== Gallery ==
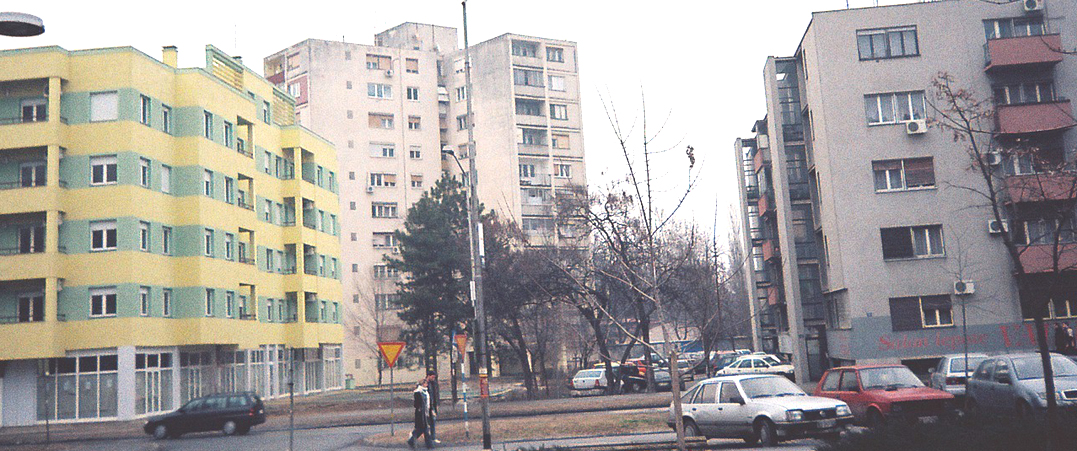
Liman I, Fruškogorska Street

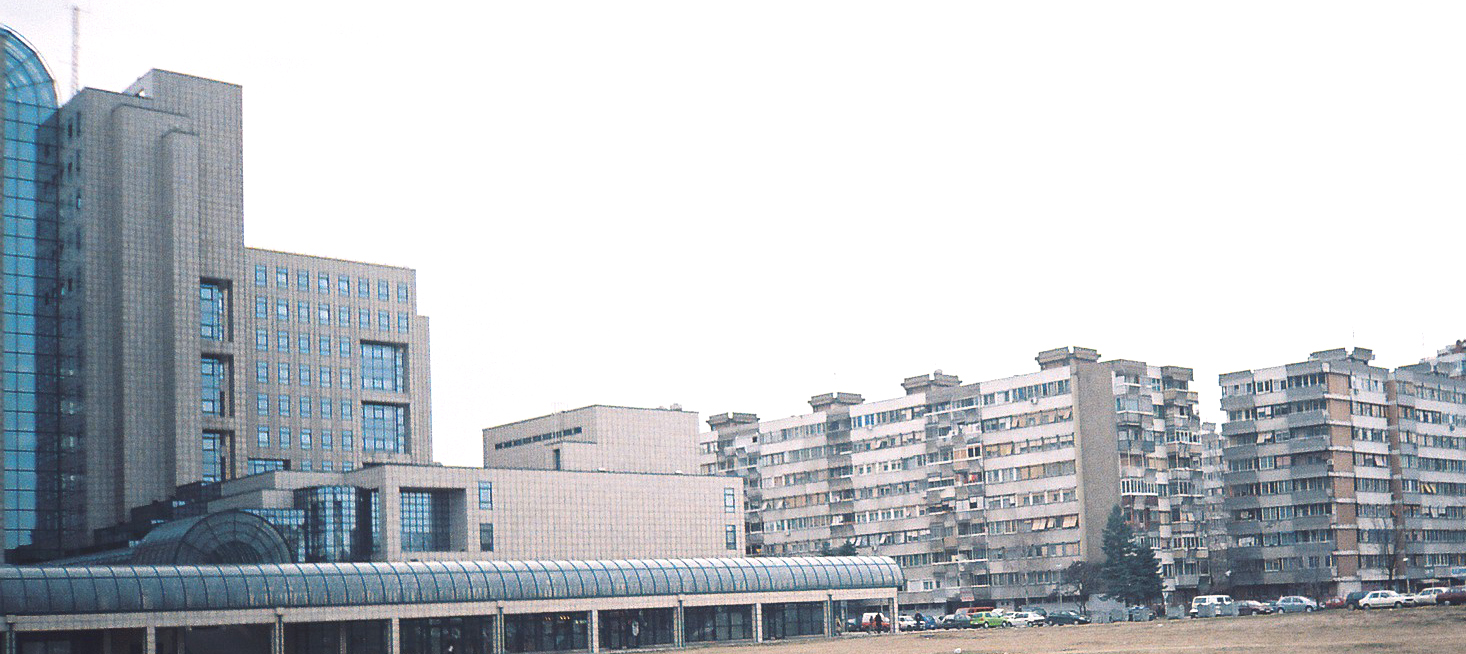
Liman III, Cara Lazara Boulevard

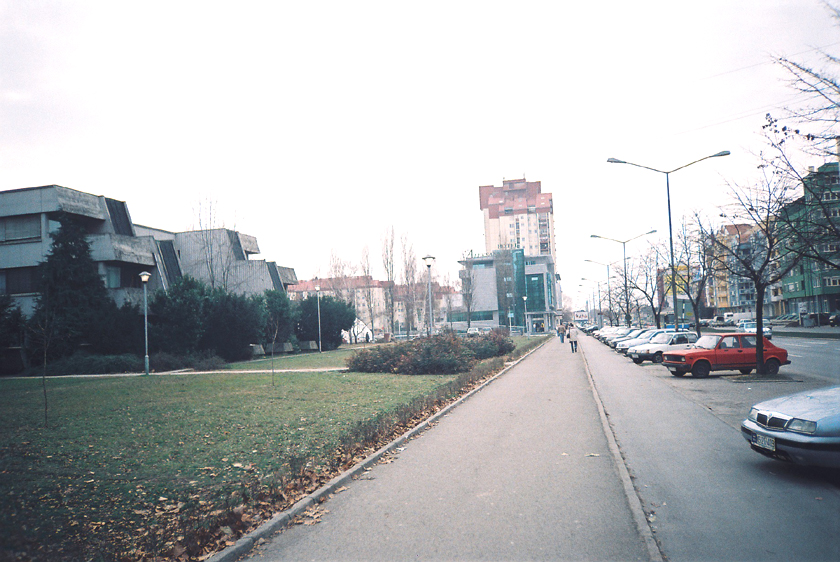
Liman IV, Cara Lazara Boulevard

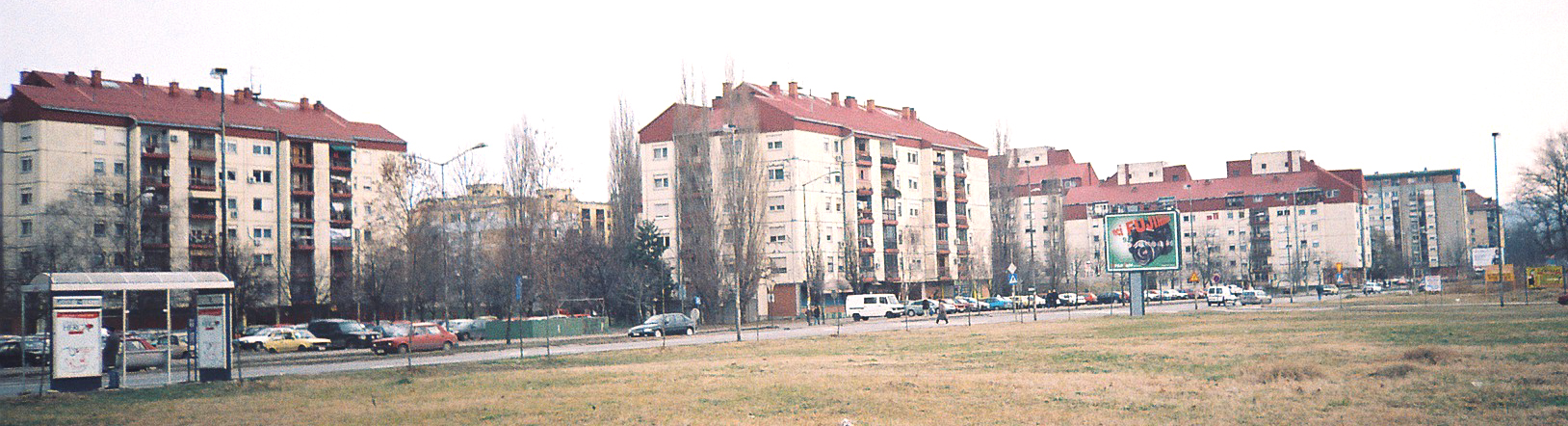
Liman IV, Iva Andrića Street

== See also ==
- Neighborhoods of Novi Sad
- Depresija
- Adamovićevo Naselje
- Grbavica
- Telep
- Stari Grad
