= Grbavica, Novi Sad =

Grbavica Грбавица
- Urban neighborhood
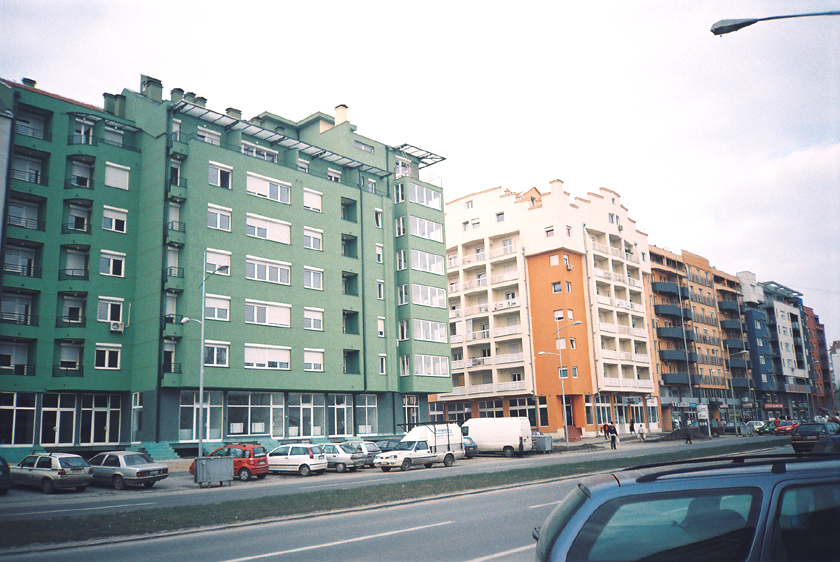
- Grbavica, Tzar Lazar Boulevard
- Interactive map of Grbavica
- Country: Serbia
- Province: Vojvodina
- District: South Bačka
- Municipality: Novi Sad
- Time zone: UTC+1 (CET)
  - Summer (DST): UTC+2 (CEST)
- Area code: +381(0)21
- Car plates: NS

Grbavica (Serbian: Грбавица) is an area of the city Novi Sad, Serbia.

== Borders ==
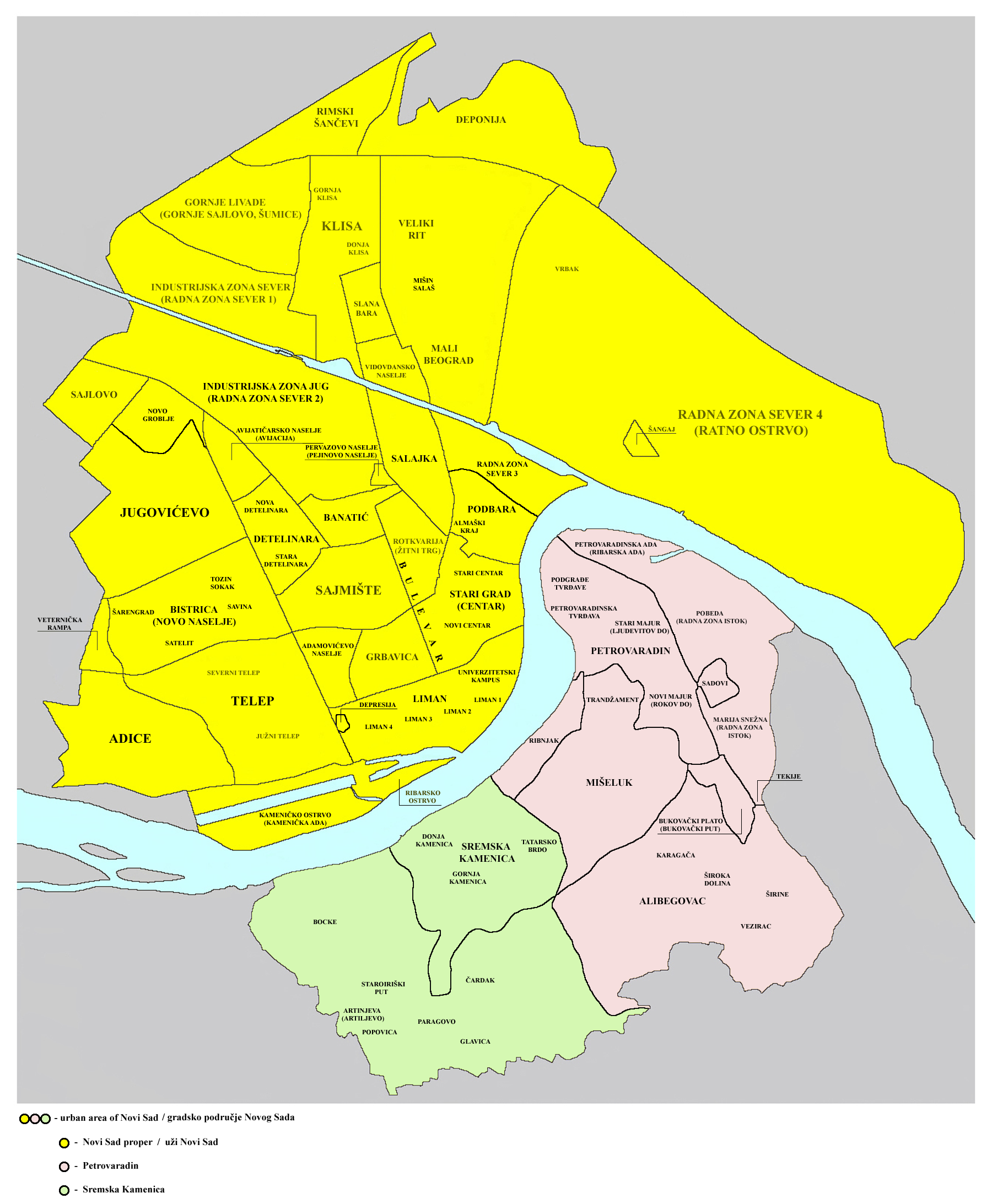
Map of the urban area of Novi Sad with city quarters, showing the location of Grbavica

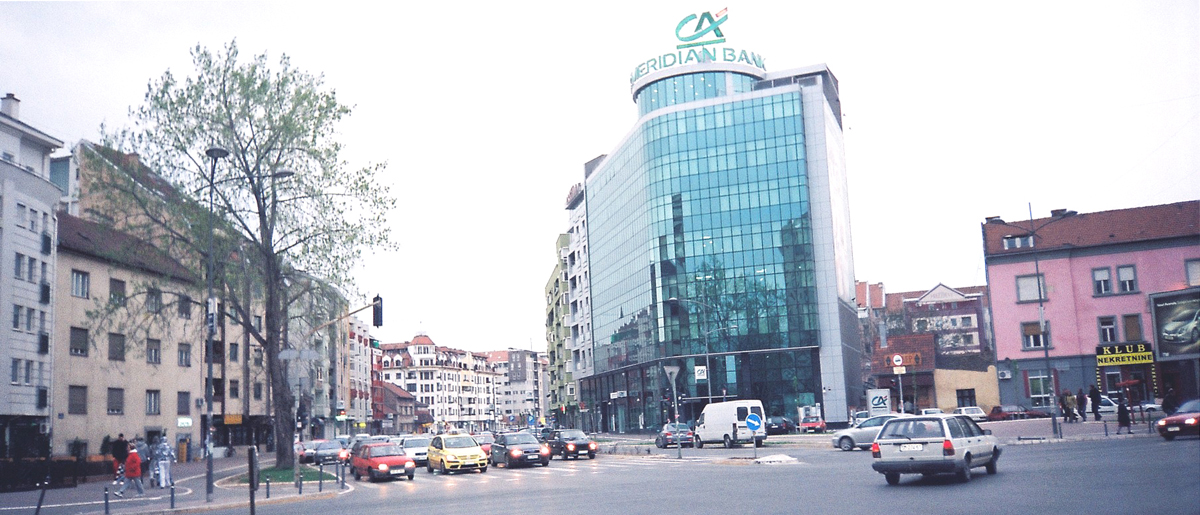
Grbavica, Braće Ribnikar Street

The northern border of Grbavica is Futoška ulica (Futoška Street), the western borders are Ulica Vojvode Knićanina (Vojvoda Knićanin Street) and Ulica Kola srpskih sestara (Kolo srpskih sestara Street), the southern border is Bulevar Cara Lazara (Tzar Lazar Boulevard), and the eastern border is Bulevar Oslobođenja (Liberation Boulevard).

== Name origin ==
Grbavica got its name from the Sarajevo settlement with the same name. When Grbavica in Novi Sad was built, the city used the same urbanistic plans, thus keeping the same name as well.

== Neighbouring settlements ==
The neighbouring settlements are: Sajmište in the north, Stari Grad in the east, Liman in the south, and Adamovićevo Naselje in the west.

== Features ==
The city's Catholic and Jewish graveyards are located in Grbavica.

== See also ==
- Neighborhoods of Novi Sad

== Gallery ==
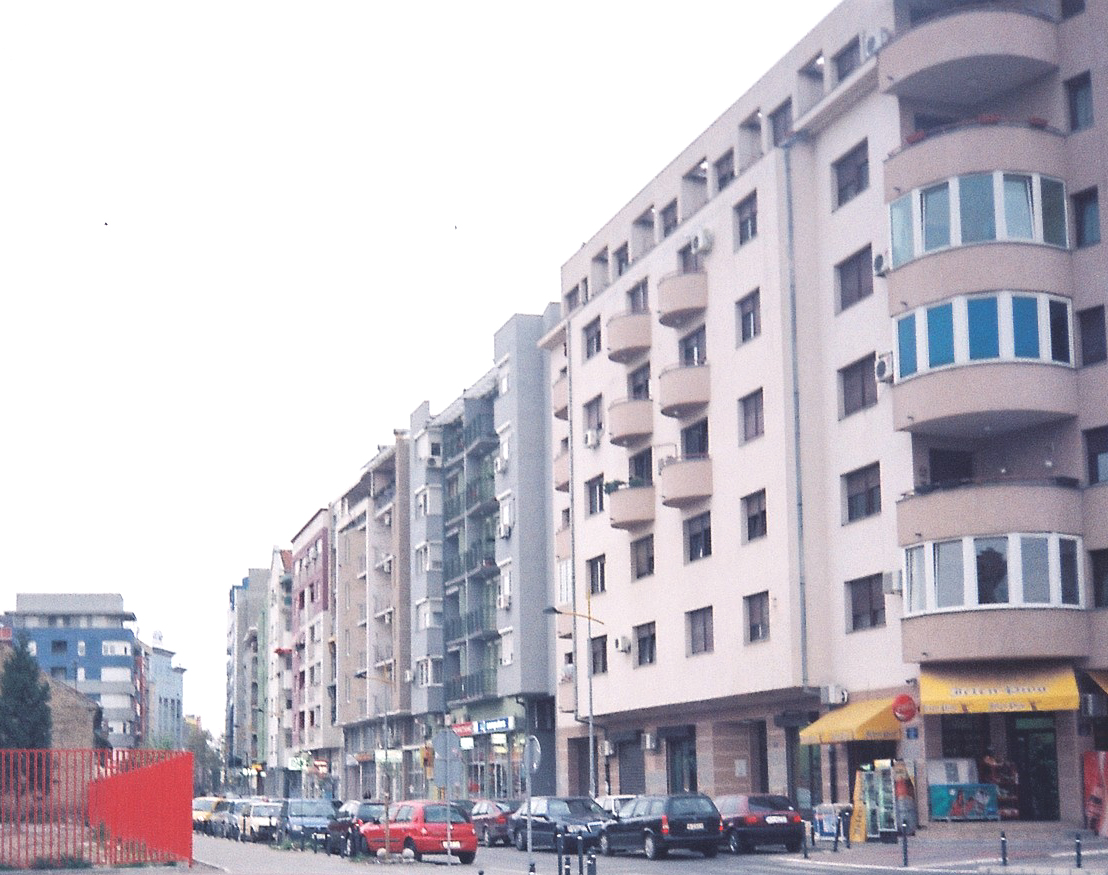
Grbavica, Danila Kiša Street

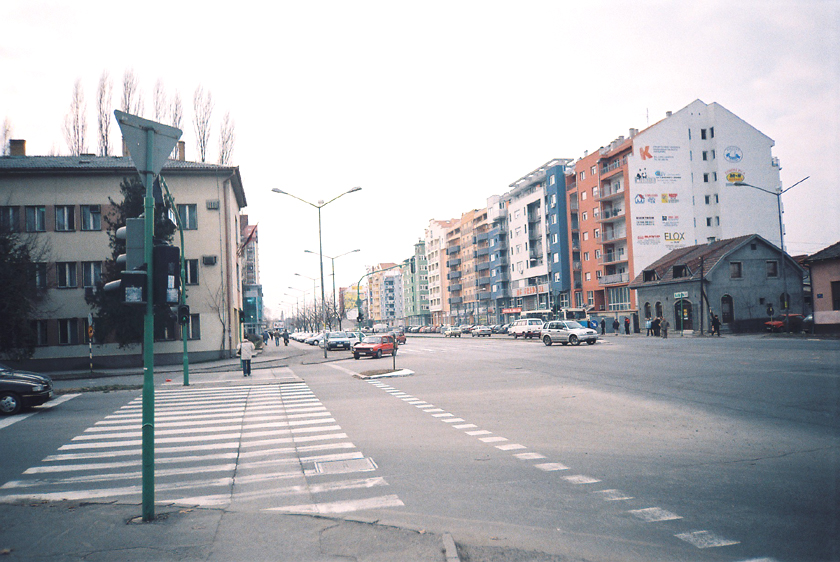
Grbavica, Tzar Lazar Boulevard

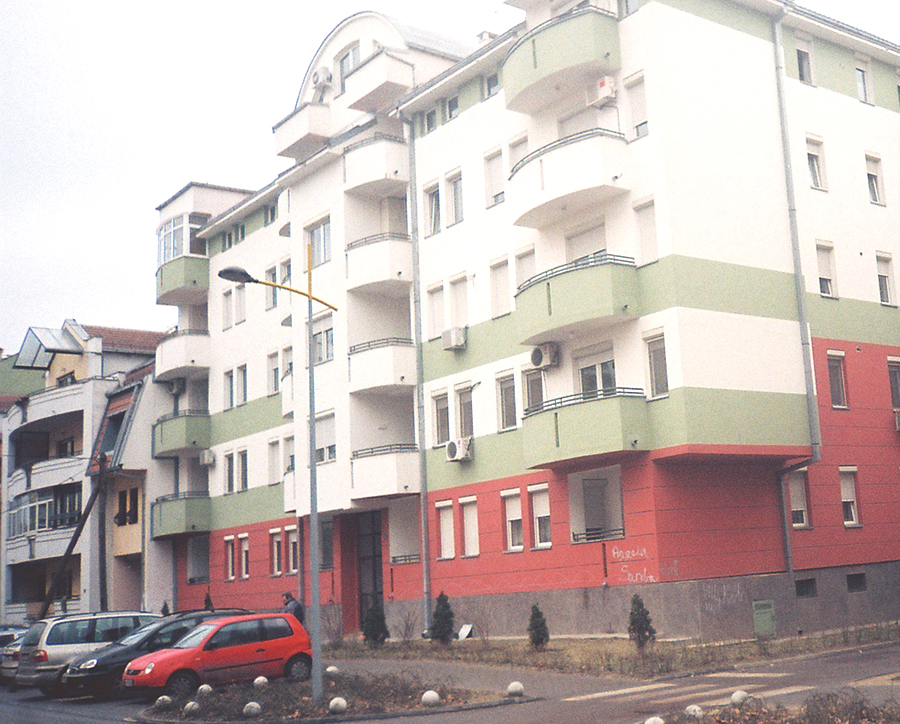
Grbavica, Tolstojeva Street

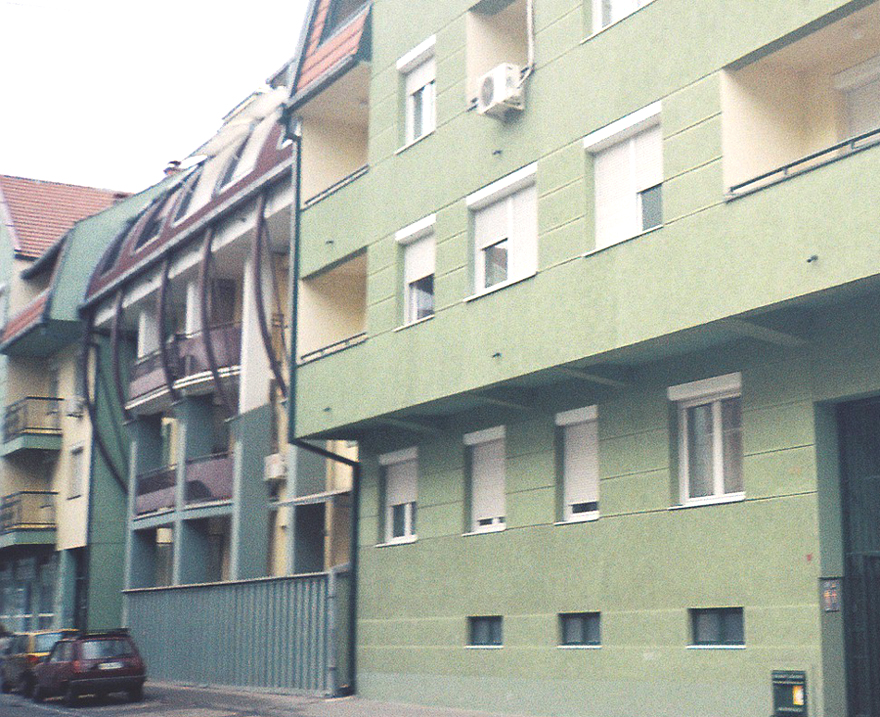
Grbavica, Miše Dimitrijevića Street

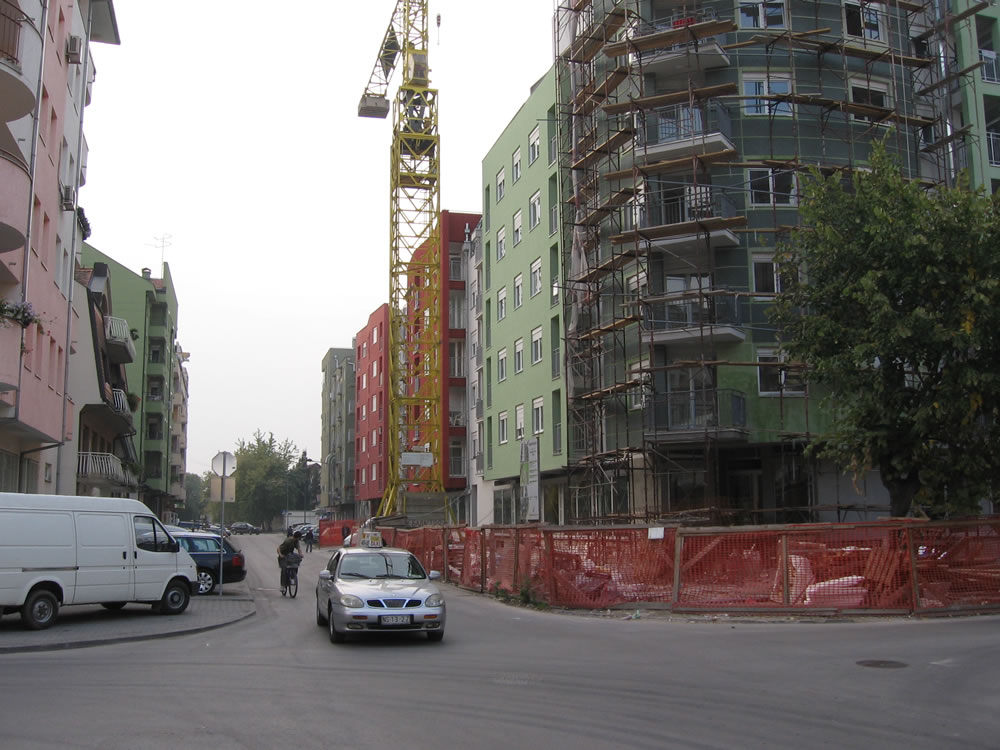
Puškinova Street

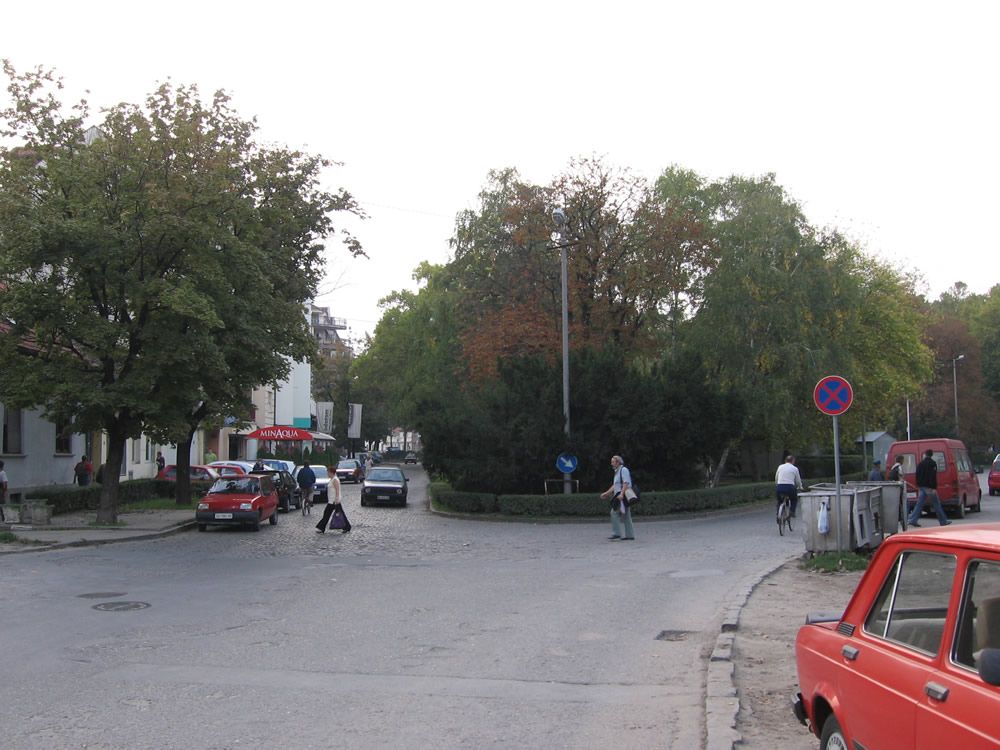
Braće Ribnikar Street
