= Adamovićevo Naselje =

Adamovićevo Naselje Адамовићево Насеље
- Urban neighborhood
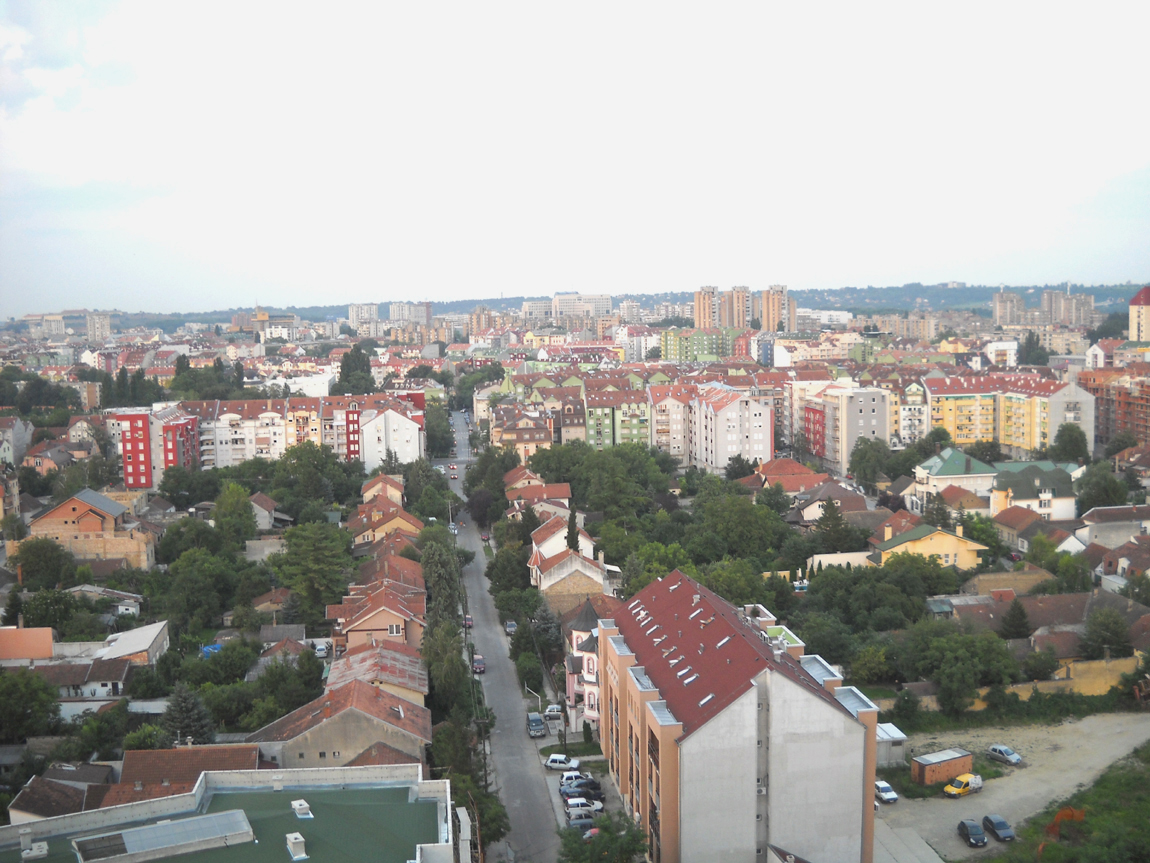
- Panoramic view of Adamovićevo Naselje

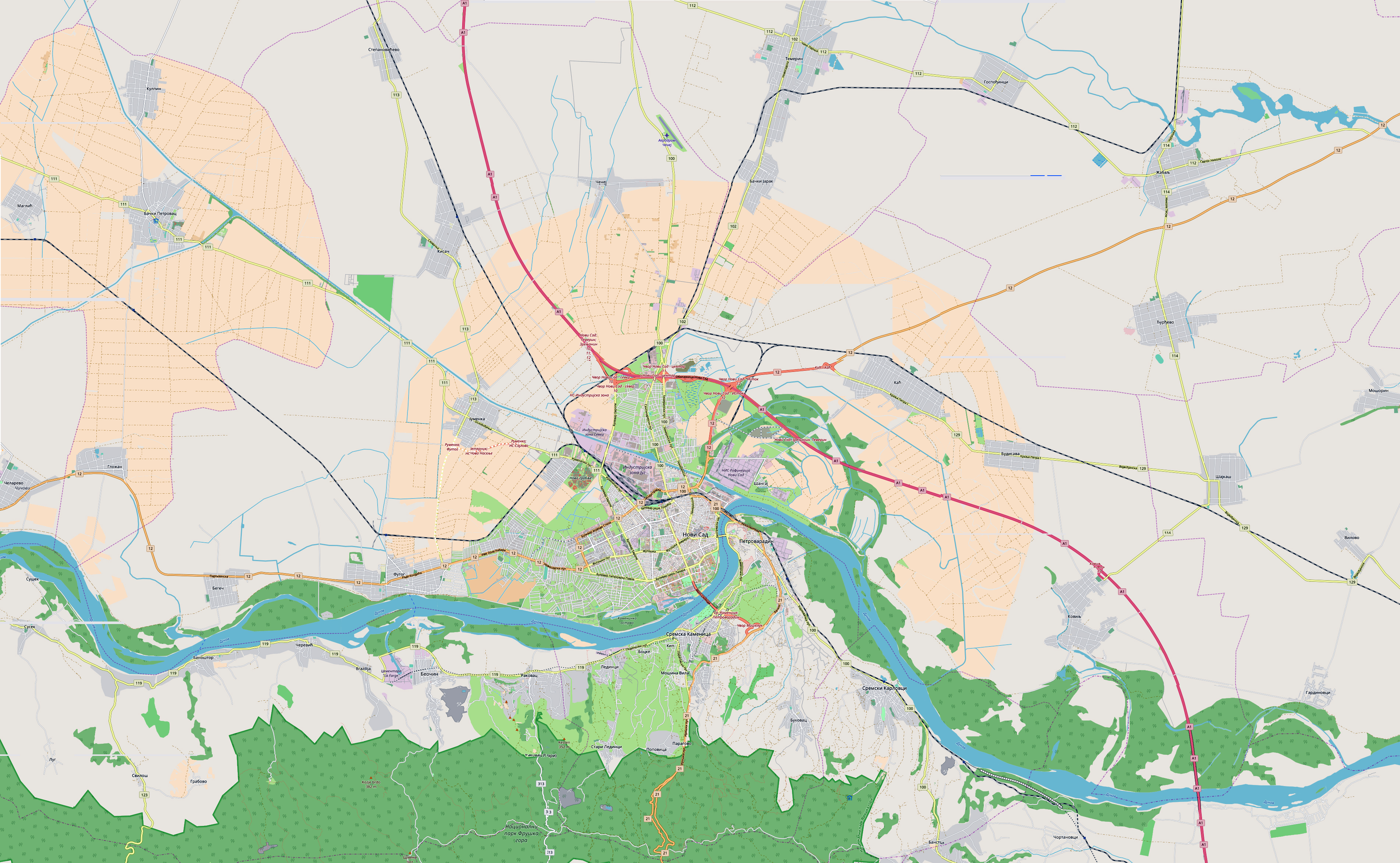
- Location within Novi Sad
- Coordinates: 45°14′43″N 19°49′26″E
- Country: Serbia
- Province: Vojvodina
- District: South Bačka
- Municipality: Novi Sad
- Time zone: UTC+1 (CET)
  - Summer (DST): UTC+2 (CEST)
- Area code: +381(0)21
- Car plates: NS

Adamovićevo Naselje (Serbian: Адамовићево Насеље) is an urban neighborhood of the city of Novi Sad, Serbia.

== Borders ==
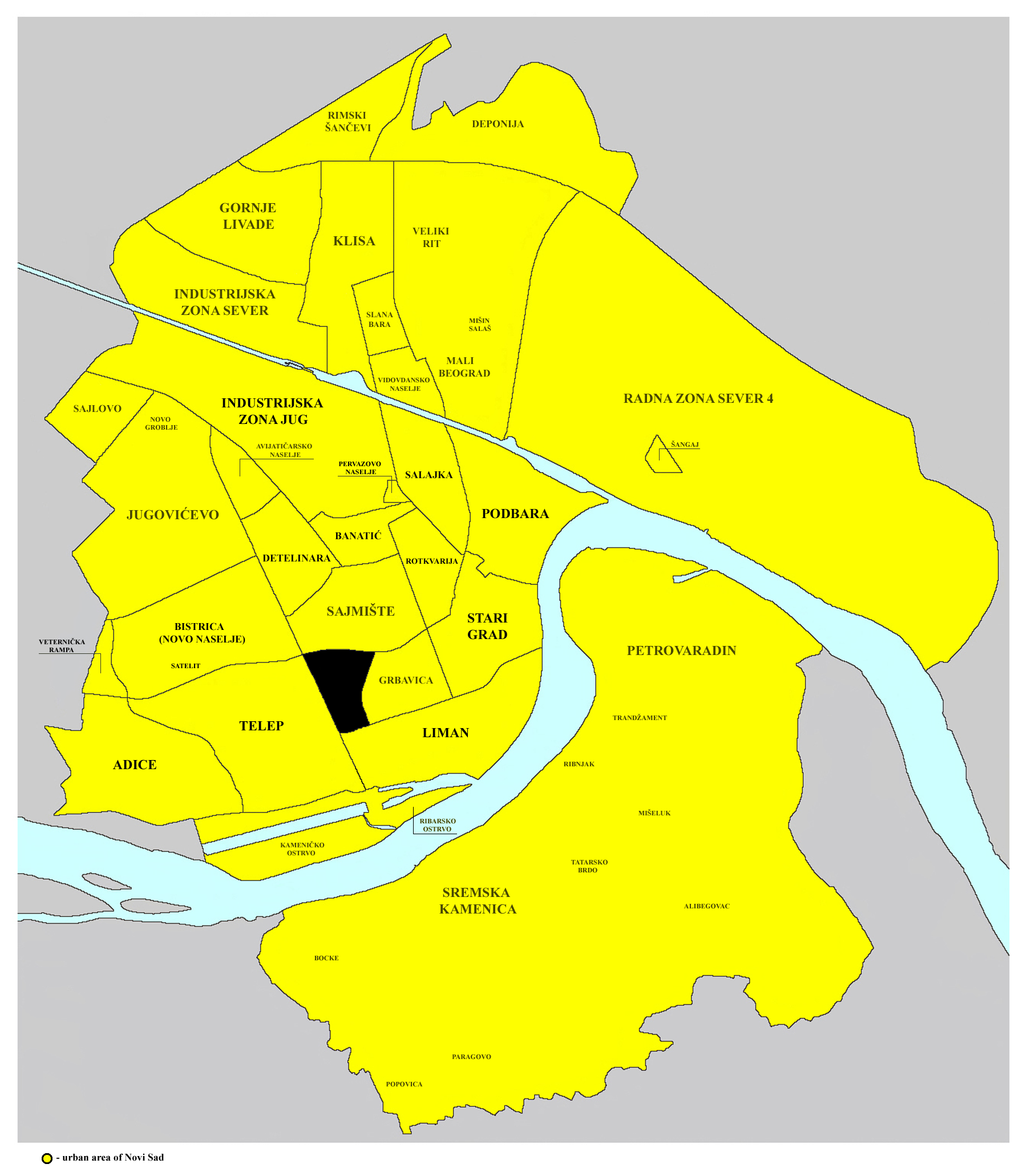
Map of the urban area of Novi Sad, showing the location of Adamovićevo Naselje

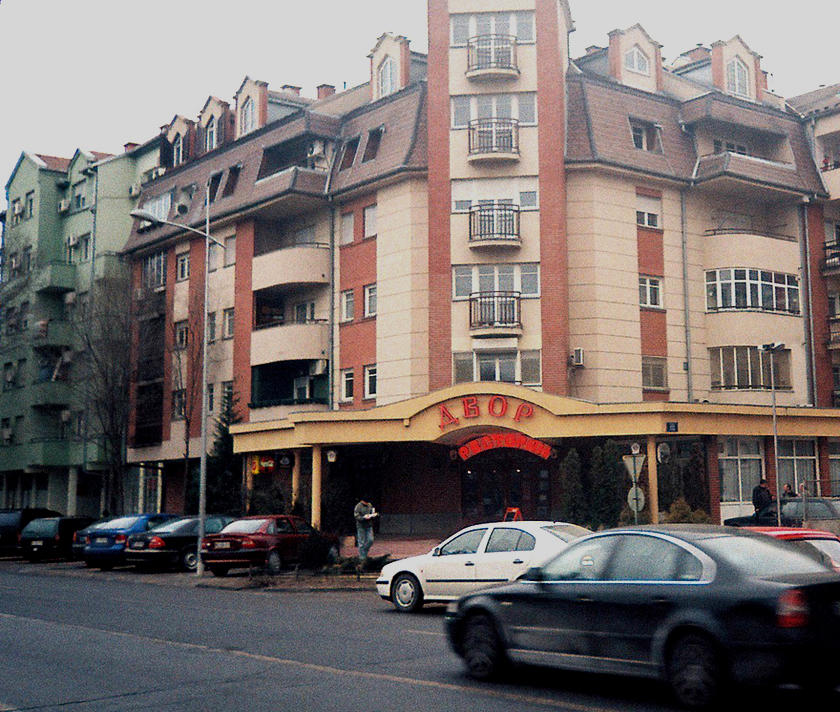
Cara Dušana Street

The northern border of Adamovićevo Naselje is Futoška ulica (Futoška Street), the eastern borders are Ulica Vojvode Knićanina (Vojvoda Knićanin Street, also called "Glib" among people) and Ulica Kola srpskih sestara (Kolo srpskih sestara Street), the southern border is Bulevar cara Lazara (Boulevard of tzar Lazar), and the western border is Bulevar Evrope (Boulevard of Europe).

In other words, Adamovićevo Naselje is located between Liman 4 in the south, Grbavica in the east, Telep in the west, and Sajmište with Provincial hospital in the north.

== Features ==
There are two schools in Adamovićevo Naselje: Vasa Stajić elementary school, and April 7 secondary school of medicine.

This part of the city is mostly composed of private houses, but in recent time (circa from the year 2000), more tier buildings have been built, mostly on major artery, Cara Dušana Street.

The Institute for public health of Vojvodina (also known as "Higijenski zavod") and University of Novi Sad Institute for poplar research (Institut za topolarstvo) are situated within the neighborhood.

Adamovićevo Naselje is home to some of the city's wealthiest families. It houses business headquarters and/or private homes of the owners of "Swisslion" (food and candy industry), "Matijević" (meat industry, "Aleksandar" (real-estate developers), and "Rodić MB" (a retail company).

In year 2006, "Subotički bulevar" (Subotica Boulevard) was built later renamed into "Bulevar Evrope" (Europe Boulevard). It is located in the place where railway tracks used to run through (space formerly occupied by Ulica Polgar Andraša (Polgar Andraš Street) and Ulica Novaka Radonjića (Novak Radonjić Street)), on the western border of Adamovićevo Naselje. Since completion of the new boulevard, many tier buildings were built in this area, with many more being under construction.

== History ==
Its old name was Daranjijevo Naselje (Daranji Telep). In 1927, it was named Adamovićevo Naselje after a famous Adamović family. Until 1944, name Adamovićevo Naselje was used for both, present-day Adamovićevo Naselje and present-day Telep, but since 1944, Telep is considered a separate neighborhood. In 2022 a new part was built called "Avenija" (Avenue) in the south of Adamovićevo Naselje.

== Politics ==
Seat of the local municipality "Olga Petrov" is located in Adamovićevo Naselje, in Cara Dušana street.

== Religious buildings ==
There are several religious buildings in the neighborhood:

- Protestant theological college
- Christian Baptist Church and Evangelic Church
- Religious building of Protestant Christian Community
- Jehovah's Witnesses prayer hall
- Masjid of Islamic Religious Community
- Franciscan monastery of Saint Ivan Kapistran
- Uniate monastery
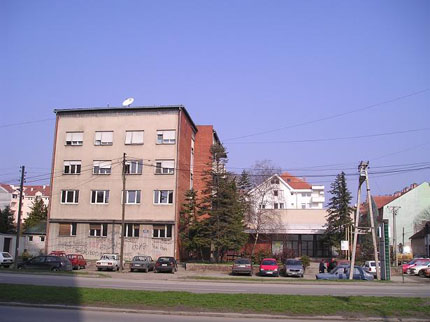
Protestant theological college in Adamovićevo Naselje

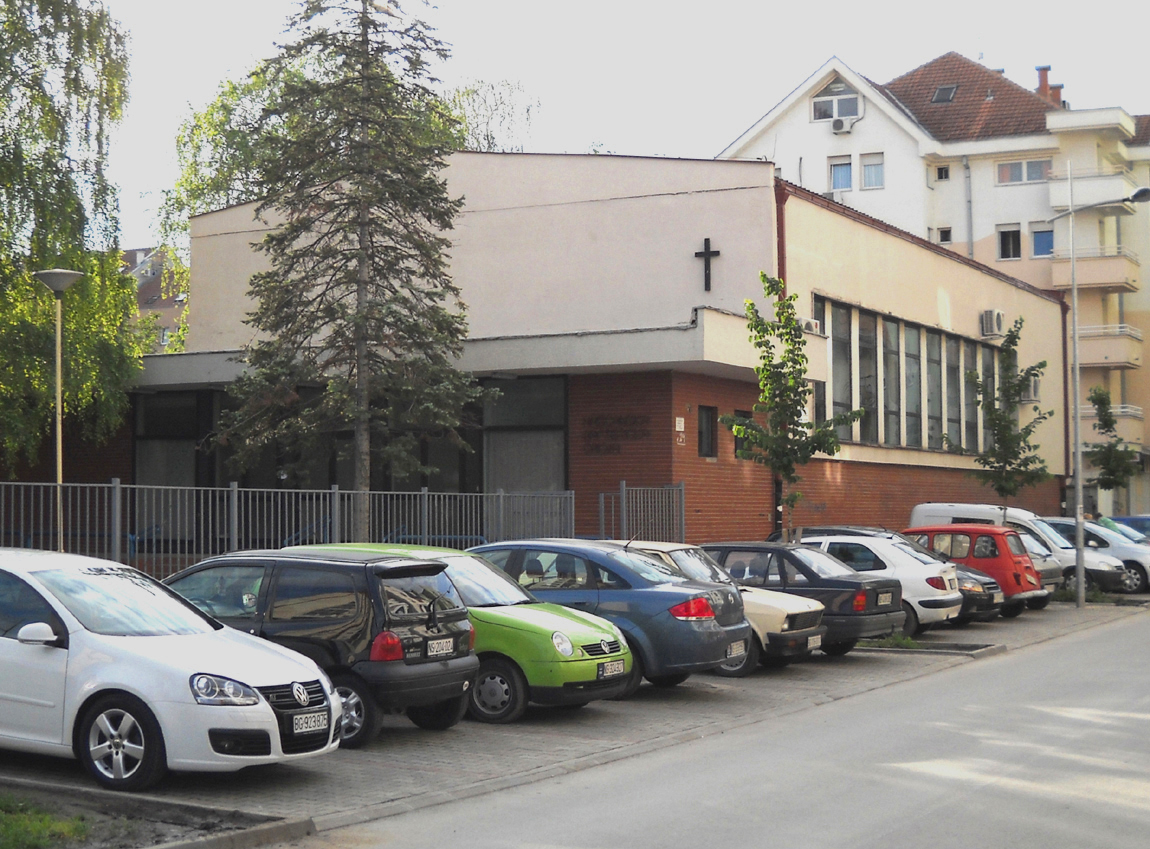
Christian Baptist Church and Evangelic Church in Adamovićevo Naselje

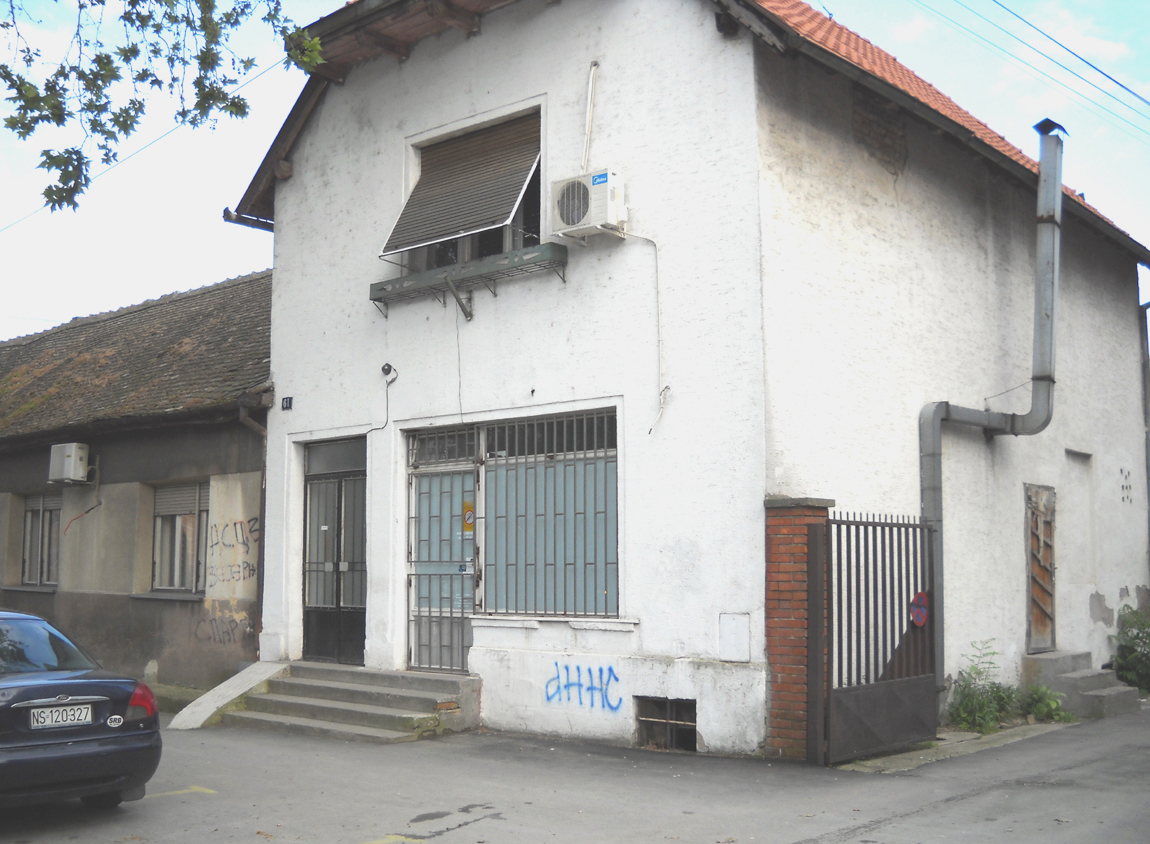
Masjid of Islamic Religious Community in Adamovićevo Naselje

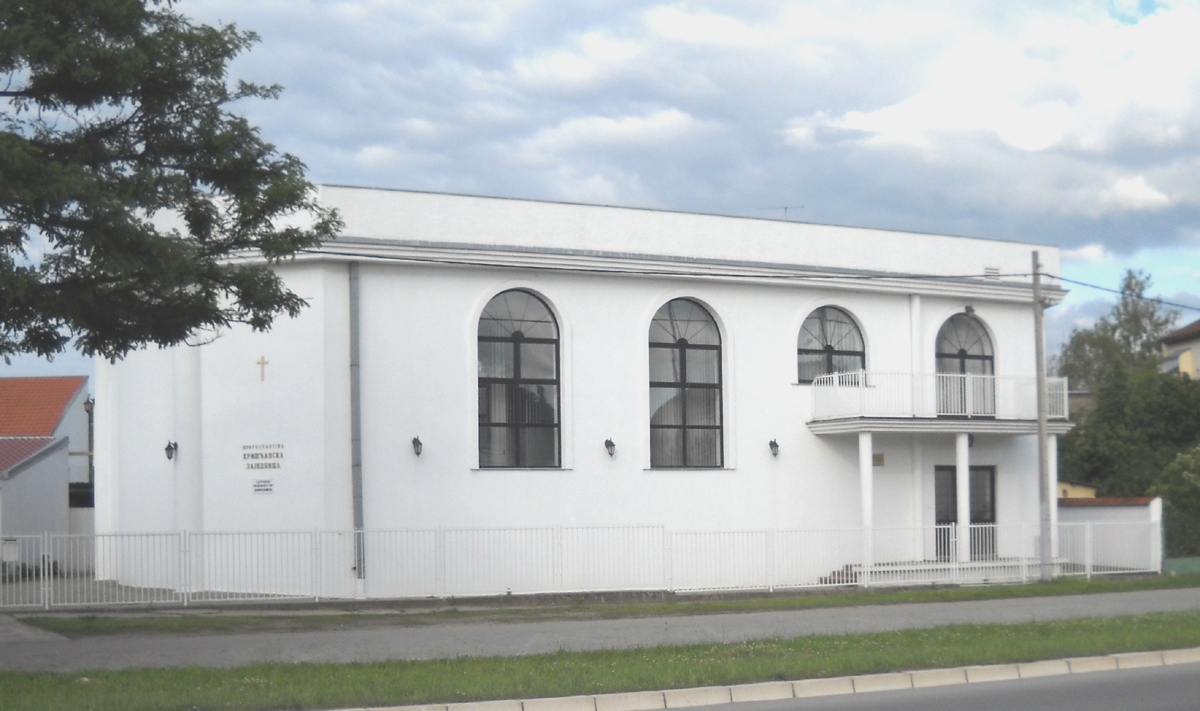
Religious building of Protestant Christian Community in Adamovićevo Naselje

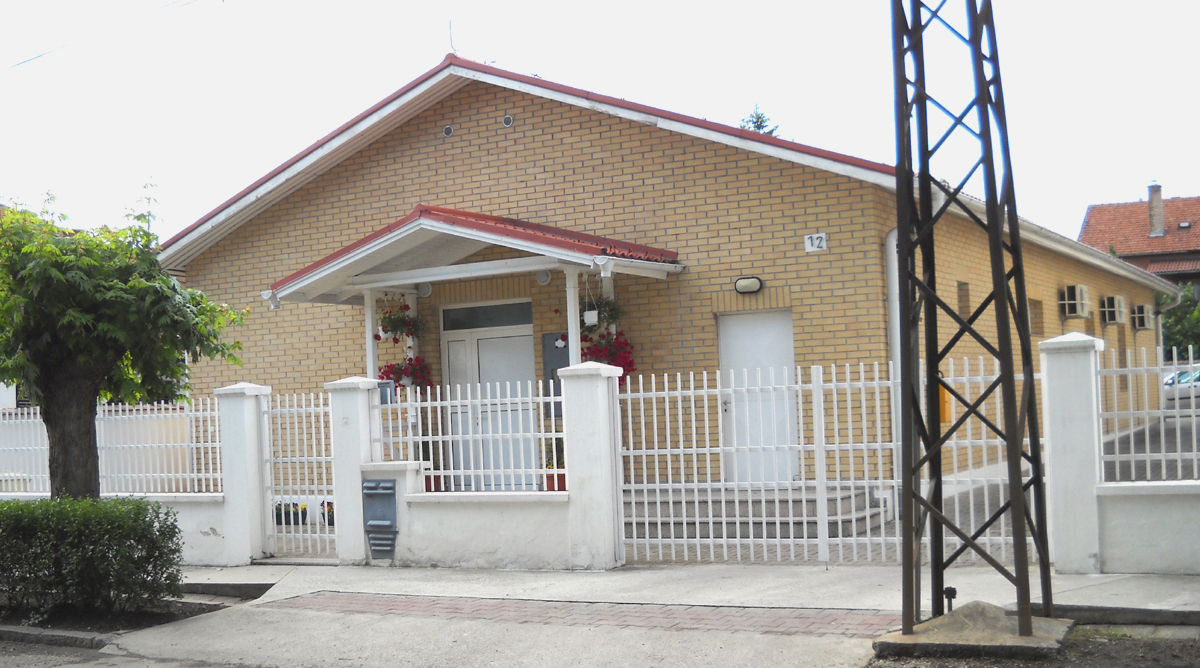
Jehovah's Witnesses prayer hall in Adamovićevo Naselje

== Public transportation ==
Lines 2, 6, 7, 9, 11, 12, 52, 53, 54, 55, 56 and 70 of municipal transportation company JGSP Novi Sad are going through or pass by Adamovićevo naselje.

== See also ==
- Neighborhoods of Novi Sad
