= Depresija =

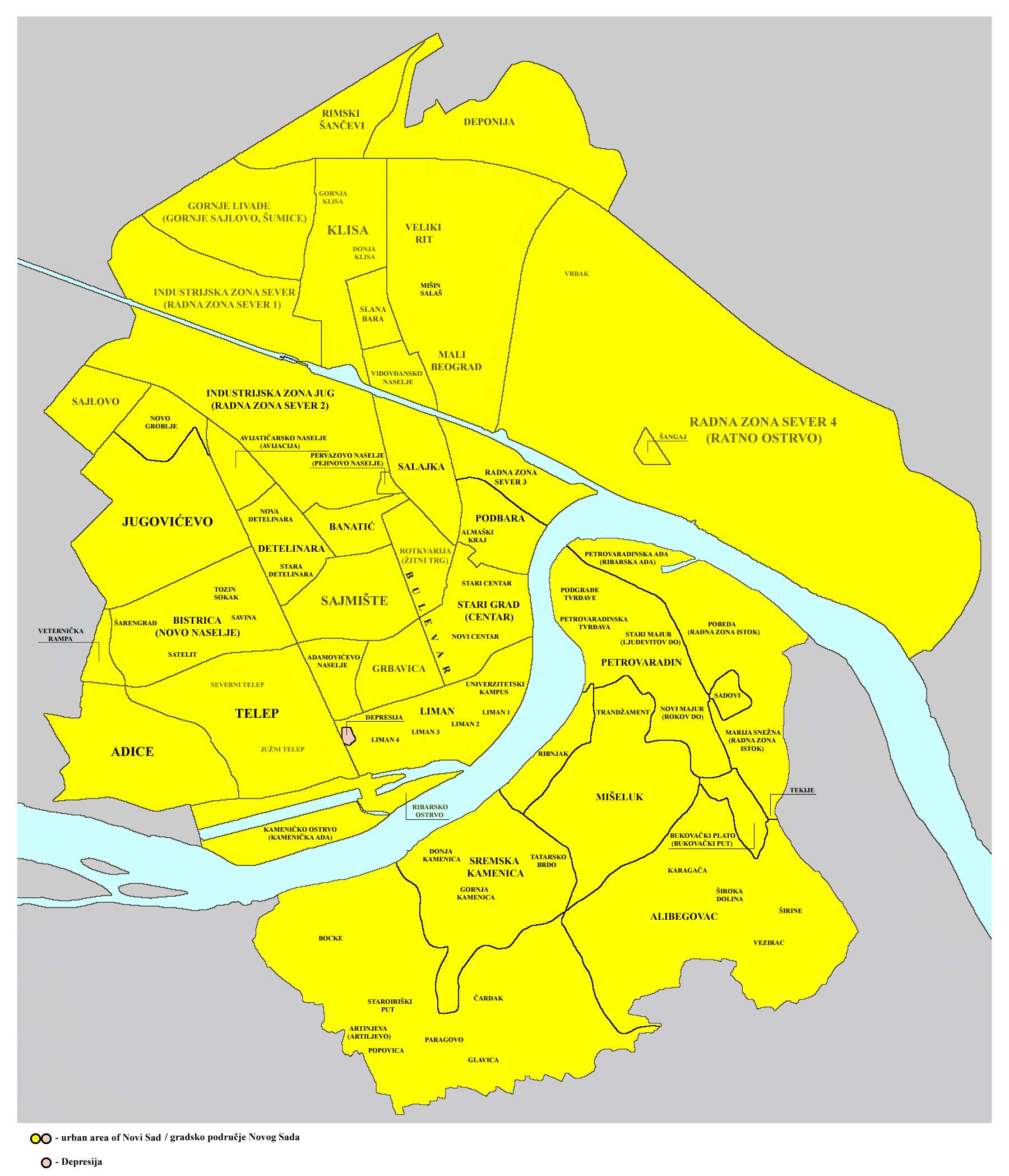
Map of the urban area of Novi Sad, showing the location of Depresija

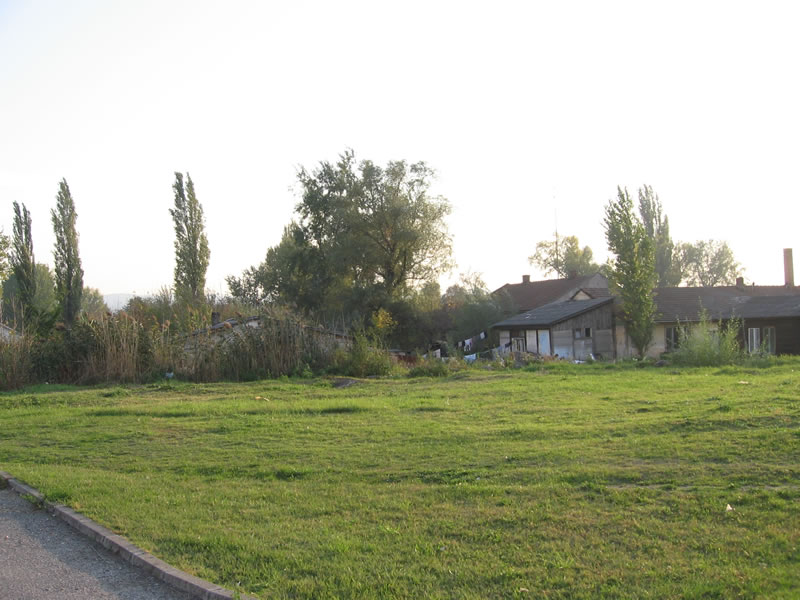
Housing in Depresija

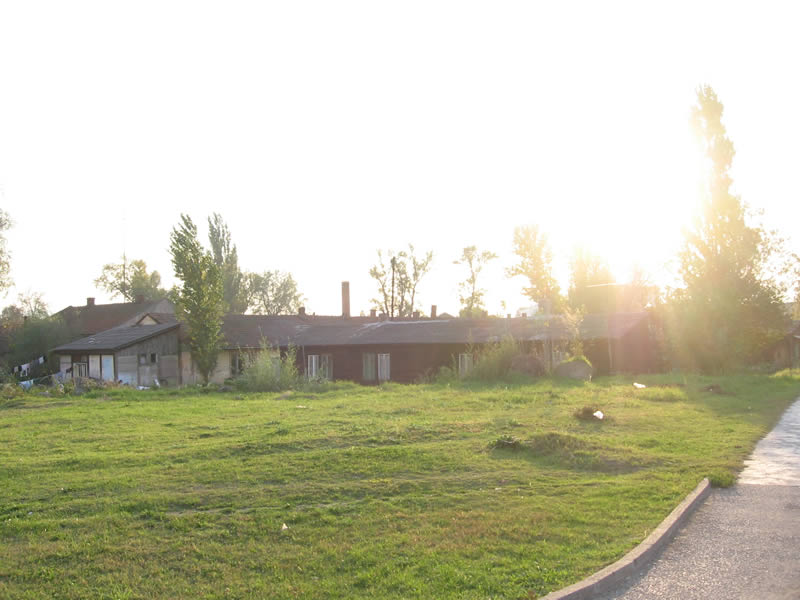
Depresija

Depresija (Serbian: Депресија) is an urban neighborhood of the city of Novi Sad, Serbia. Its name (meaning 'depression') is derived from the area's low physical elevation.

== Location ==
Depresija is located in Sime Matavulja Street between Liman and Telep and is part of the "Ivo Andrić" local community.

== Population ==
The population of the neighborhood consists of 150 people or 45 families, mostly of Romani origin.

== See also ==
- Neighborhoods of Novi Sad
- Liman
- List of Roma settlements
