= Sajmište, Novi Sad =

Sajmište Сајмиште
- Urban neighborhood
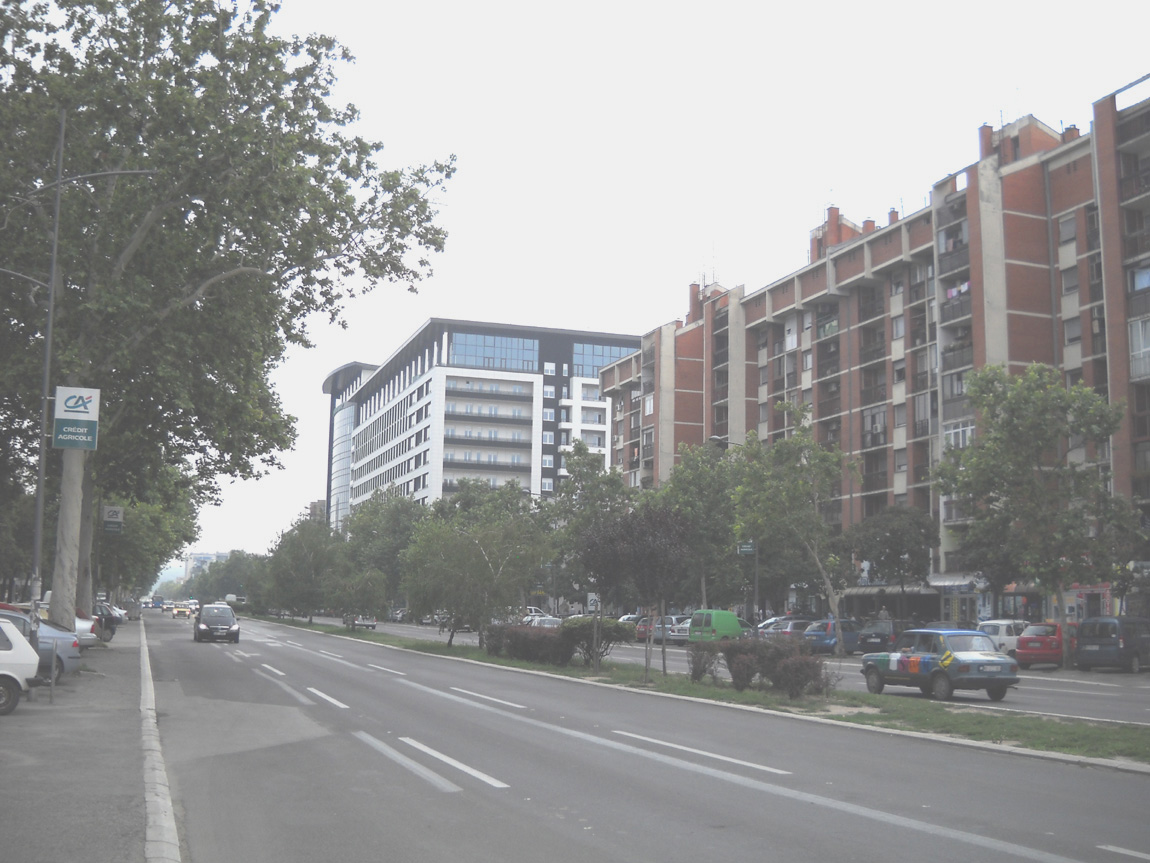
- Sajmište, Liberation boulevard
- Interactive map of Sajmište
- Country: Serbia
- Province: Vojvodina
- District: South Bačka
- Municipality: Novi Sad
- Time zone: UTC+1 (CET)
  - Summer (DST): UTC+2 (CEST)
- Area code: +381(0)21
- Car plates: NS

Sajmište (Serbian: Сајмиште) is an urban neighborhood of the city of Novi Sad, Serbia.

== Borders ==
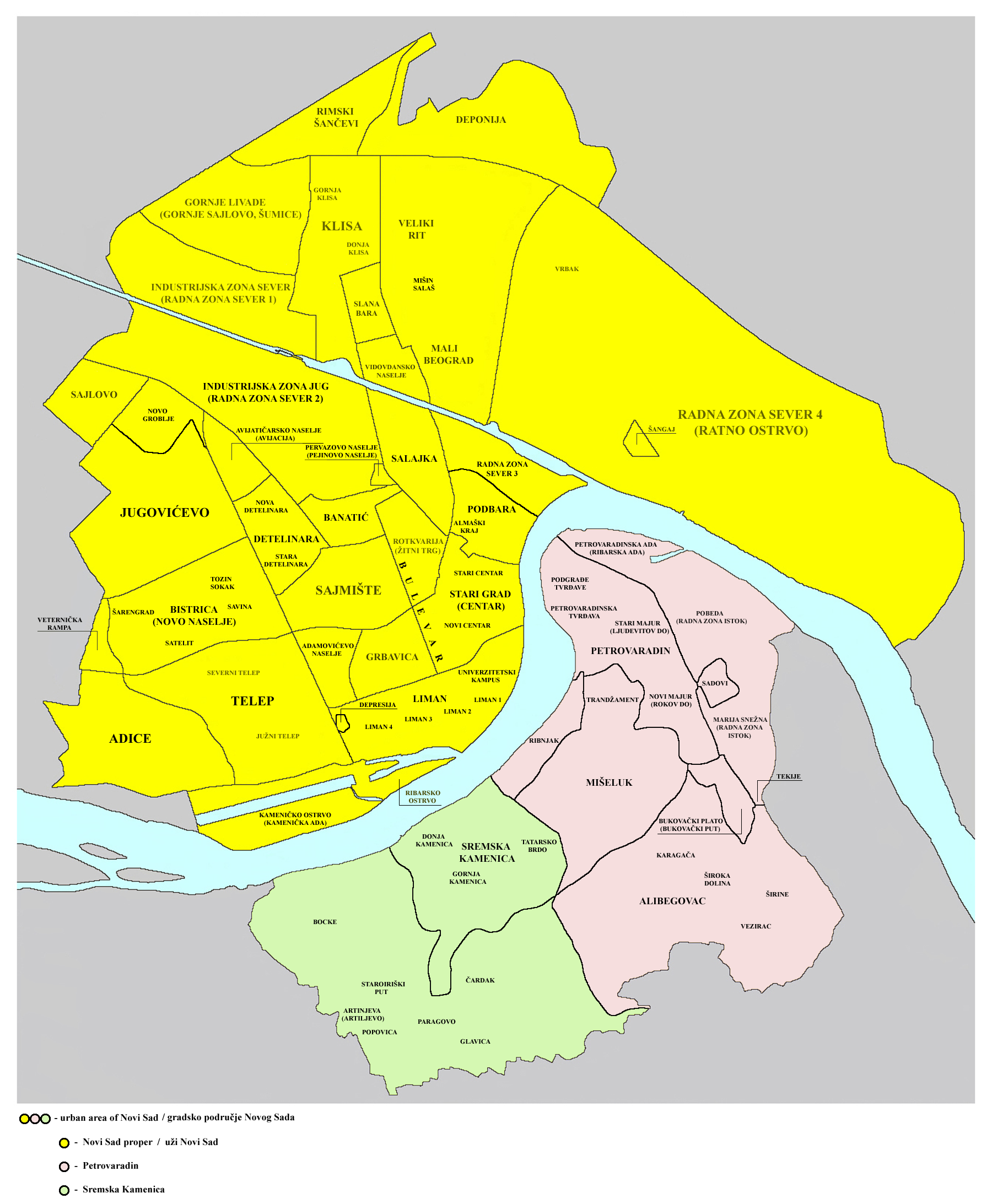
Map of the urban area of Novi Sad with city quarters, showing the location of Sajmište

The southern border of Sajmište is Futoška ulica (Futoška Street), the eastern border is Bulevar oslobođenja (Liberation Boulevard), the northern borders are Bulevar kralja Petra I (King Petar I Boulevard) and Ulica Braće Popović (Braće Popović Street), the north-western border is Ulica Branka Bajića (Branko Bajić Street), and the western border is a section of Subotički bulevar (Subotica Boulevard).

== Neighbouring settlements ==
The neighbouring settlements are: Novo Naselje in the west, Detelinara in the north-west, Banatić in the north, Rotkvarija in the east, and Grbavica and Adamovićevo Naselje in the south.

== Features ==
The important institutions located in Sajmište are: Provincial Hospital (Pokrajinska bolnica), Medical Faculty (Medicinski Fakultet) and Novi Sad Fair (Novosadski sajam).

== Gallery ==
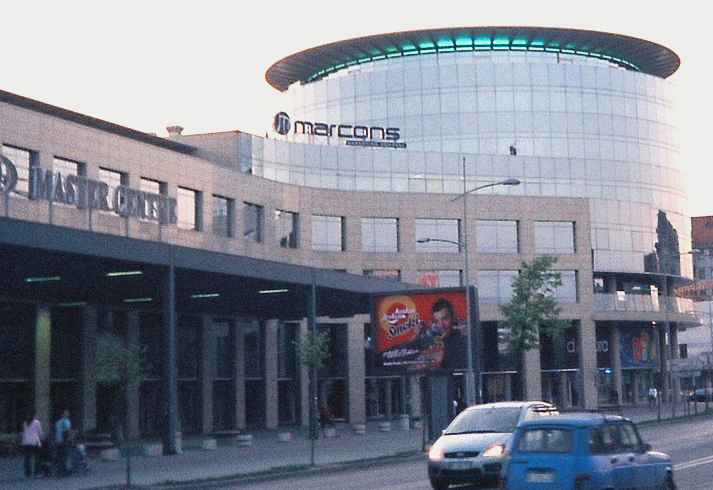
Sajmište, Master Center

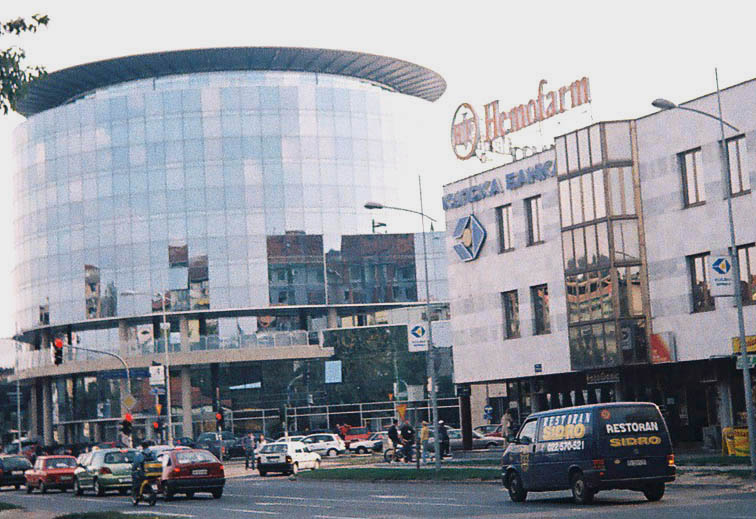
Sajmište, Master Center

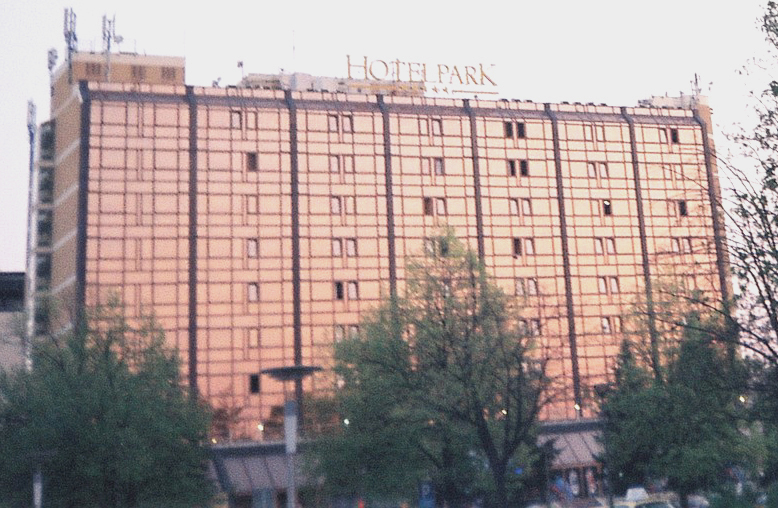
Sajmište, Hotel Park

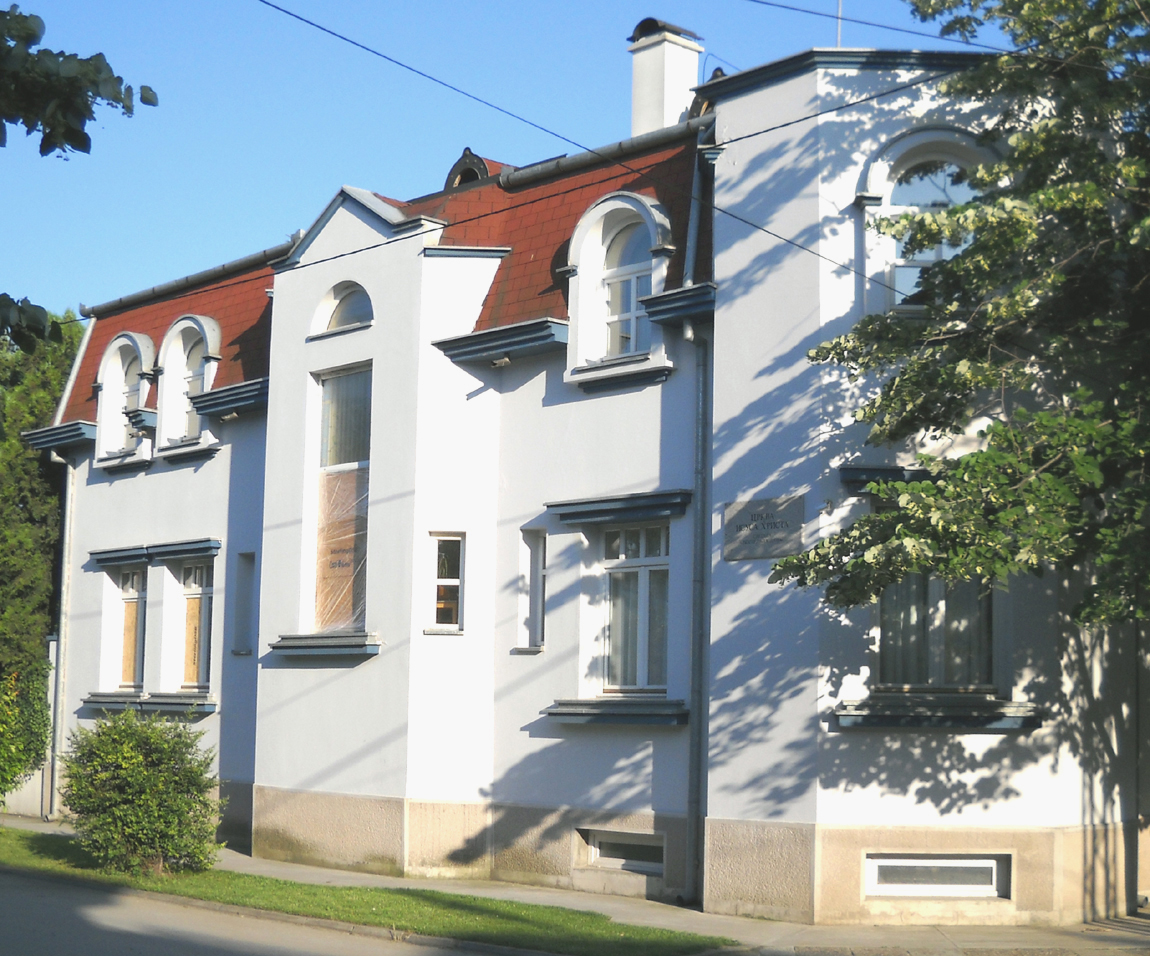
Meetinghouse of the Church of Jesus Christ of Latter-day Saints in Sajmište

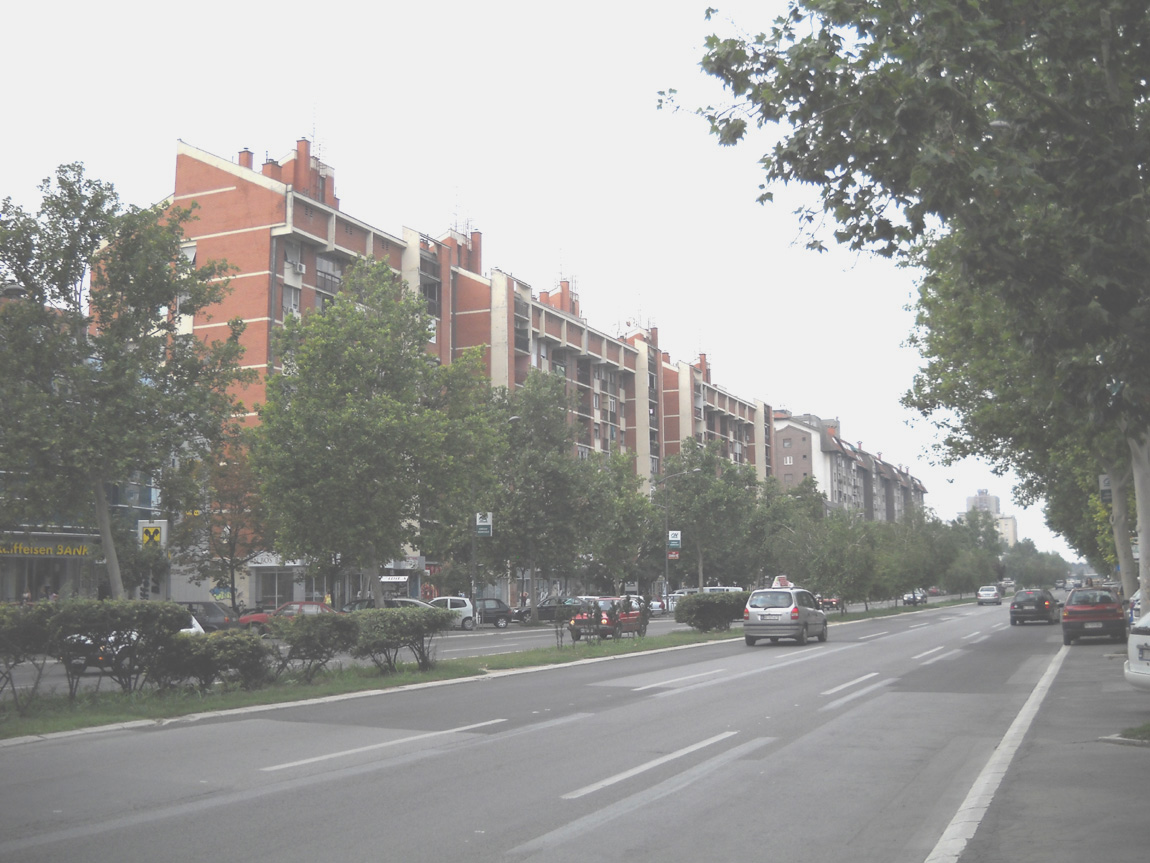
Sajmište, Liberation boulevard

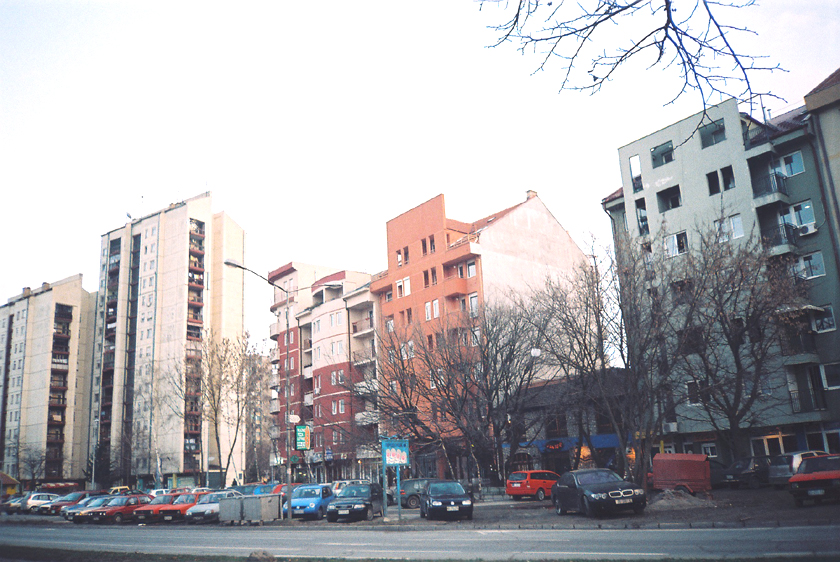
Sajmište, King Petar I Boulevard

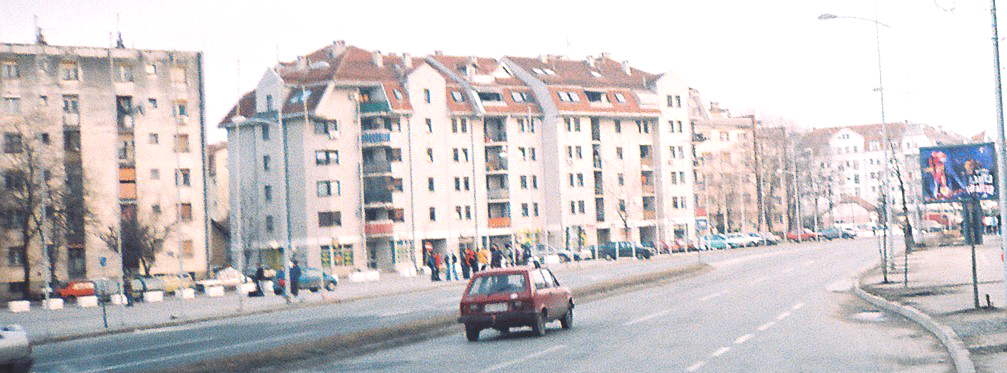
Sajmište, Hajduk Veljkova Street

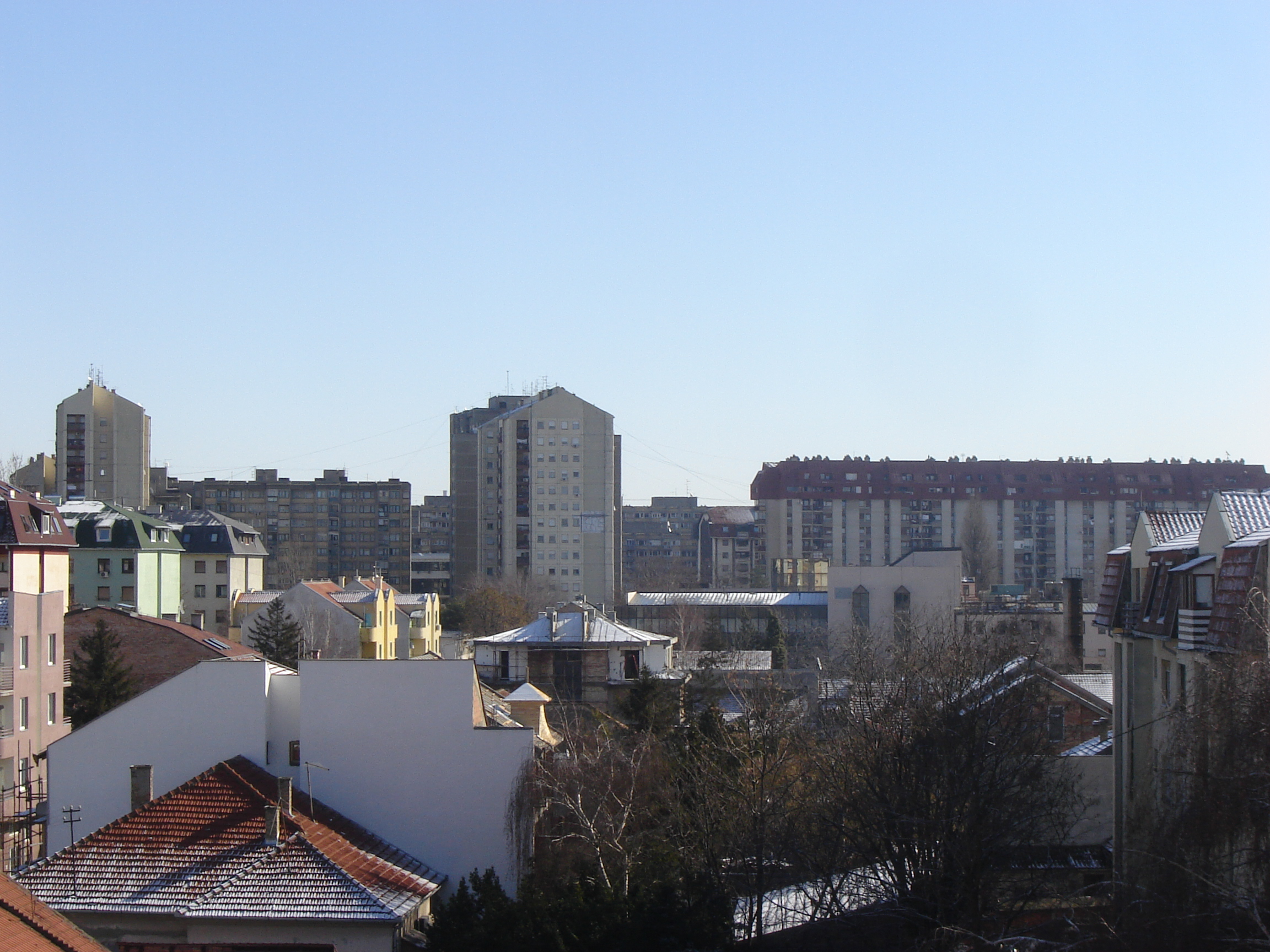
Panoramic view of Sajmište

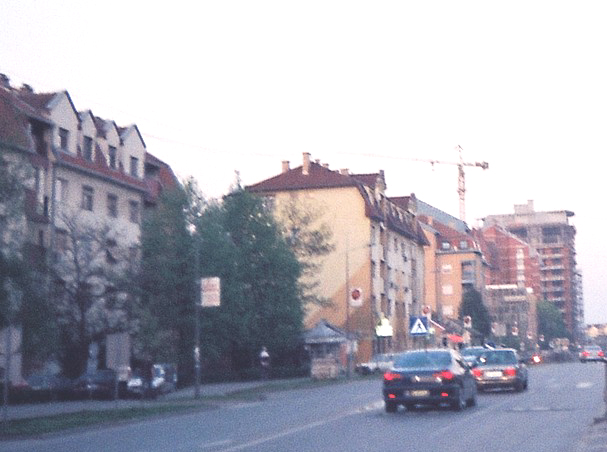
Sajmište, Novosadskog sajma street

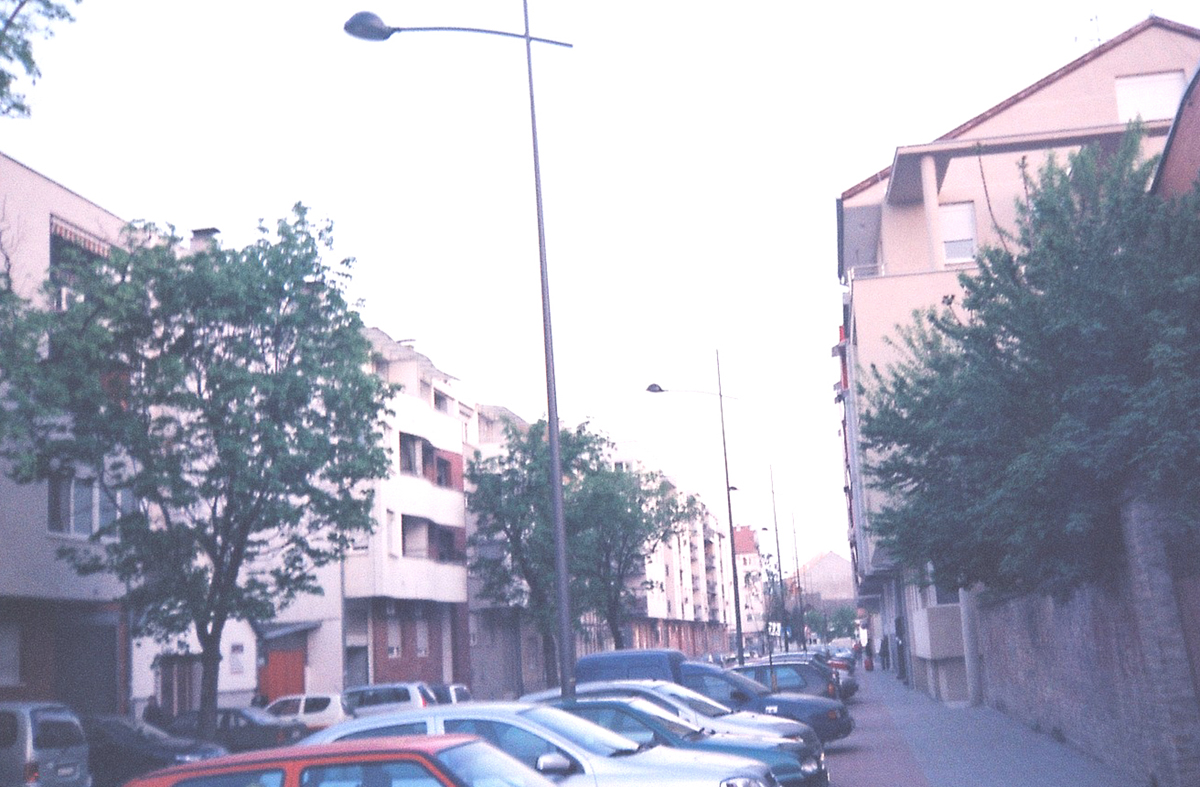
Sajmište, Bore Prodanovića street

== See also ==
- Neighborhoods of Novi Sad
