= Novi Sad =

City in Vojvodina, Serbia

Novi Sad Нови Сад (Serbian) Újvidék (Hungarian) Nový Sad (Slovak) Нови-Сад (Pannonian Rusyn)
- City
- City of Novi Sad; Град Нови Сад
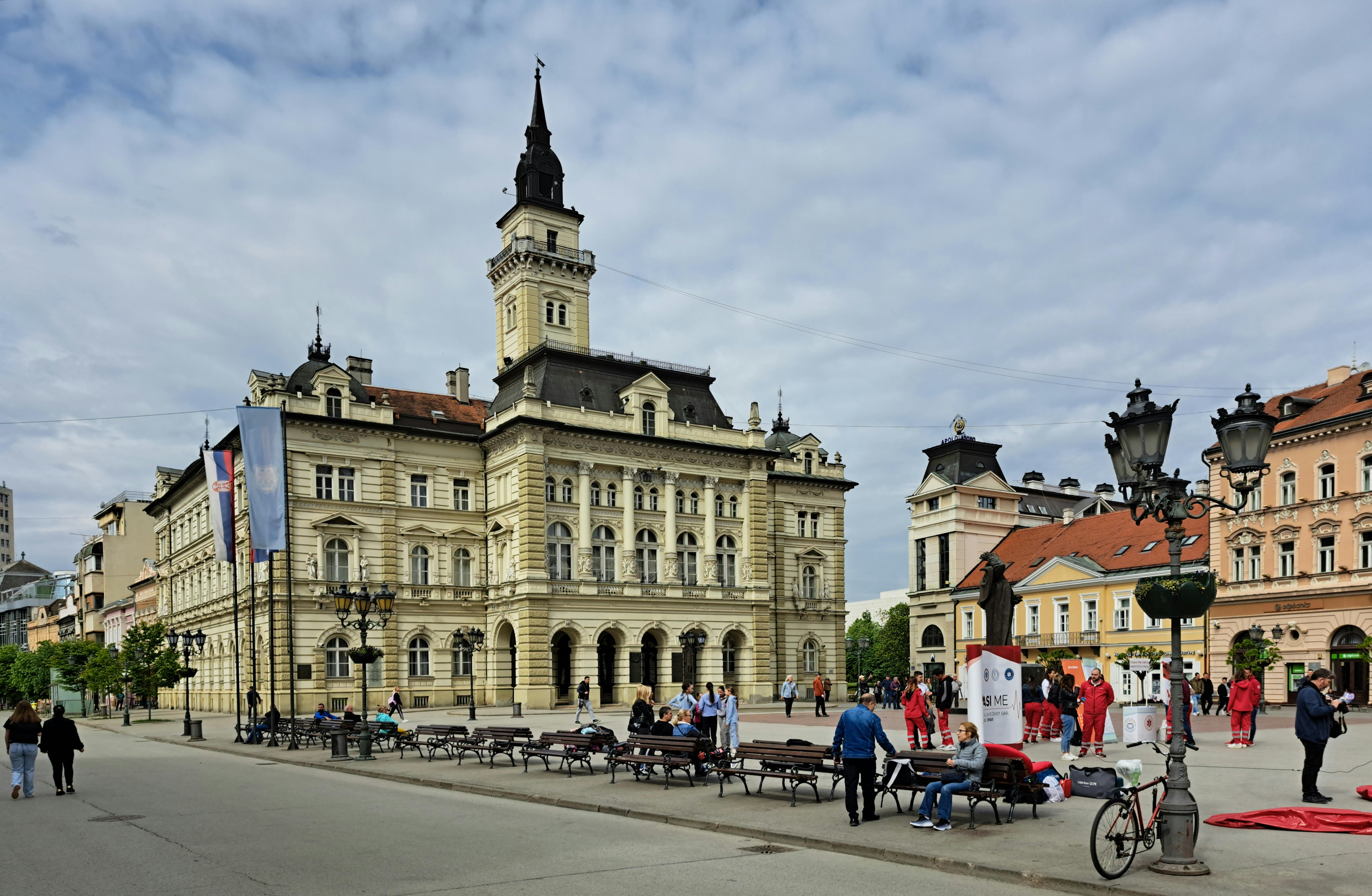
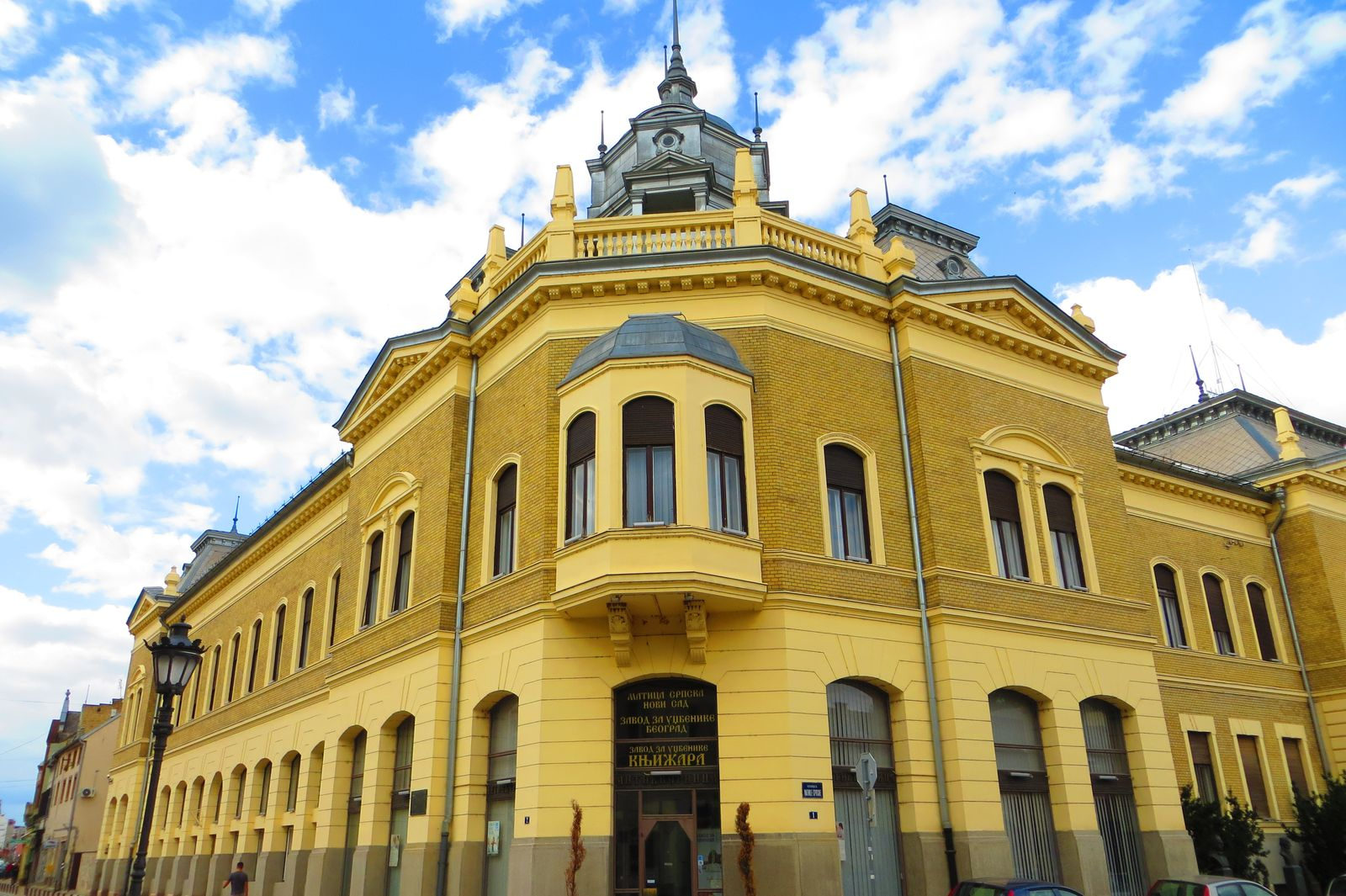
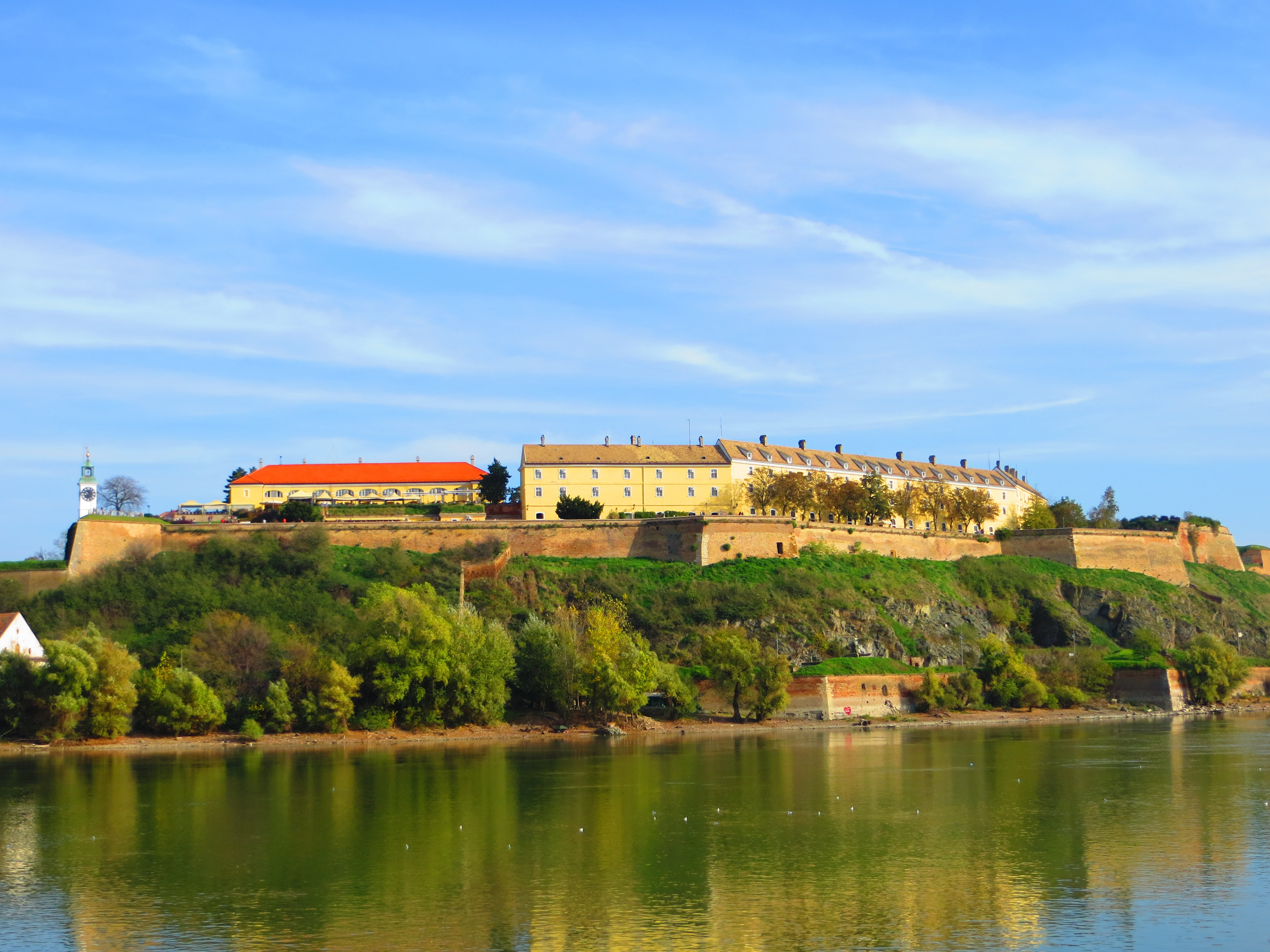
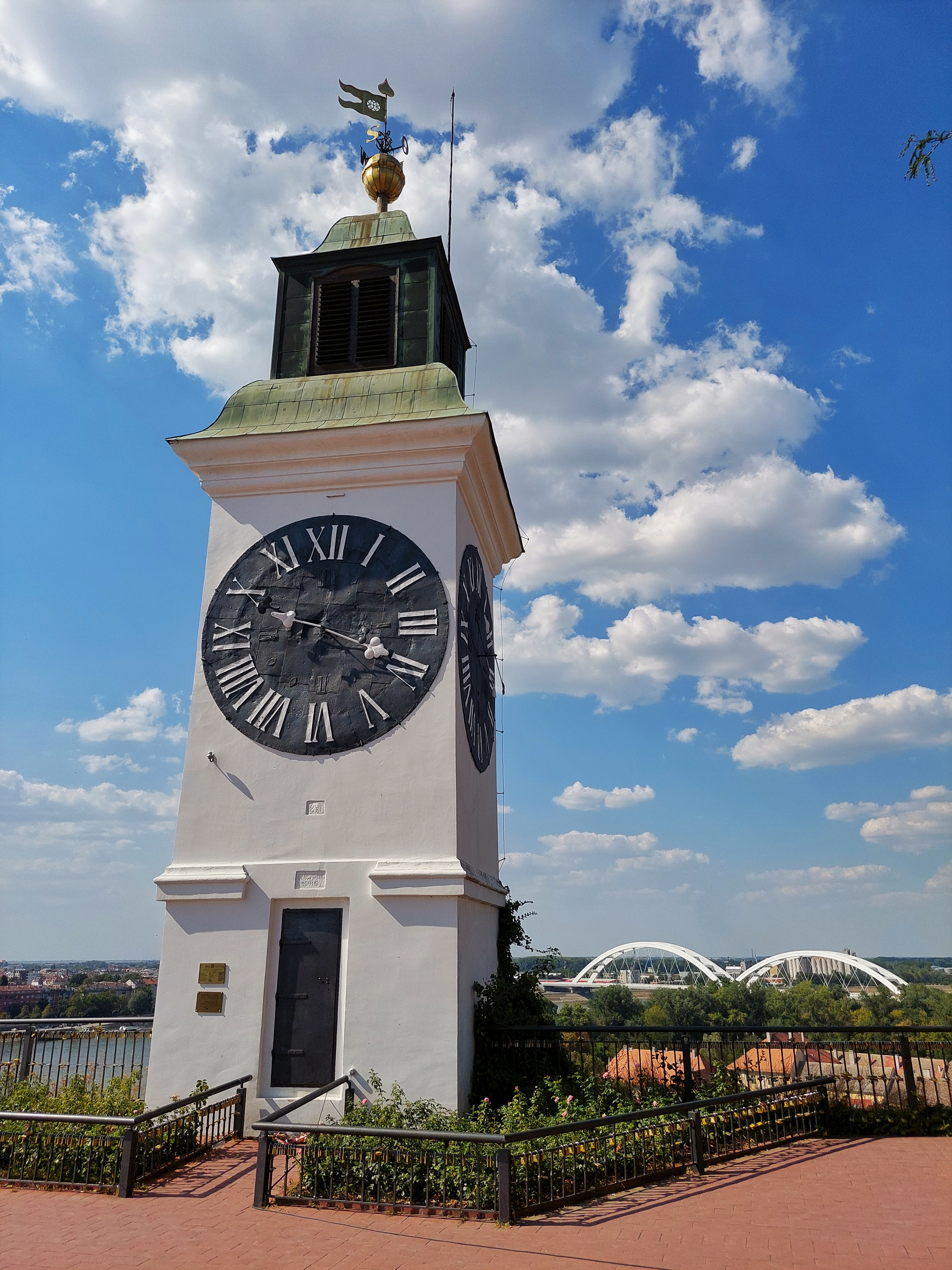
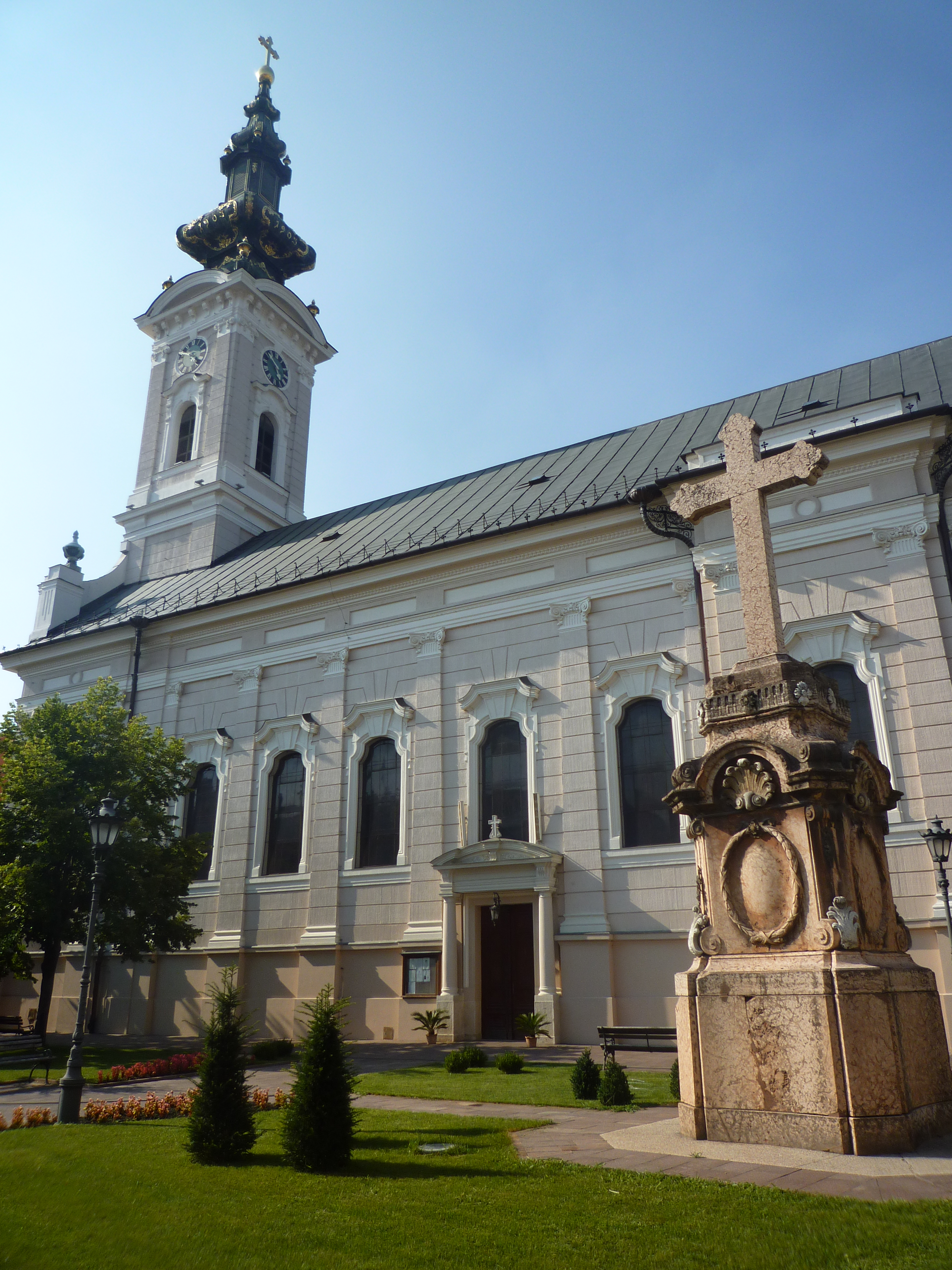
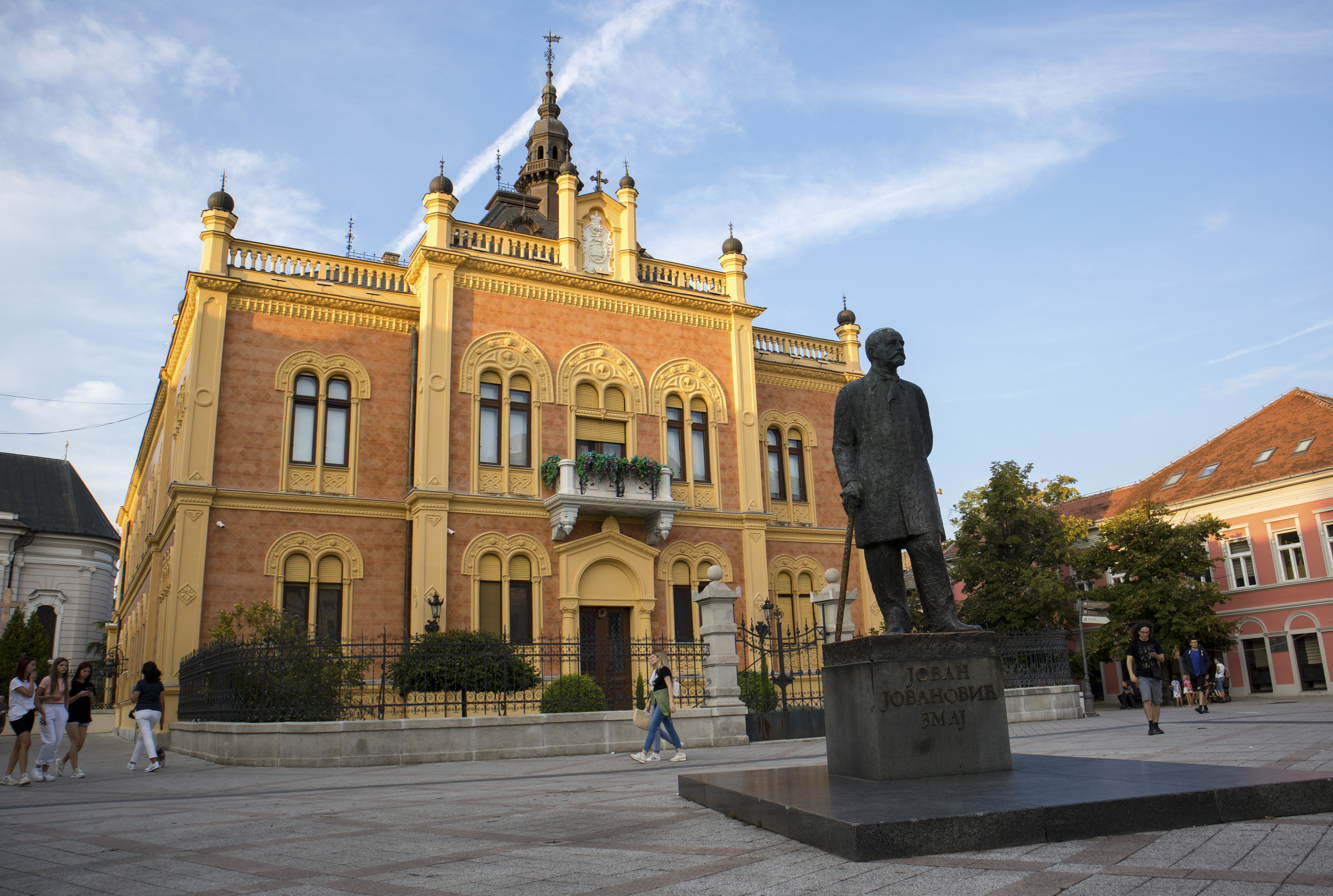
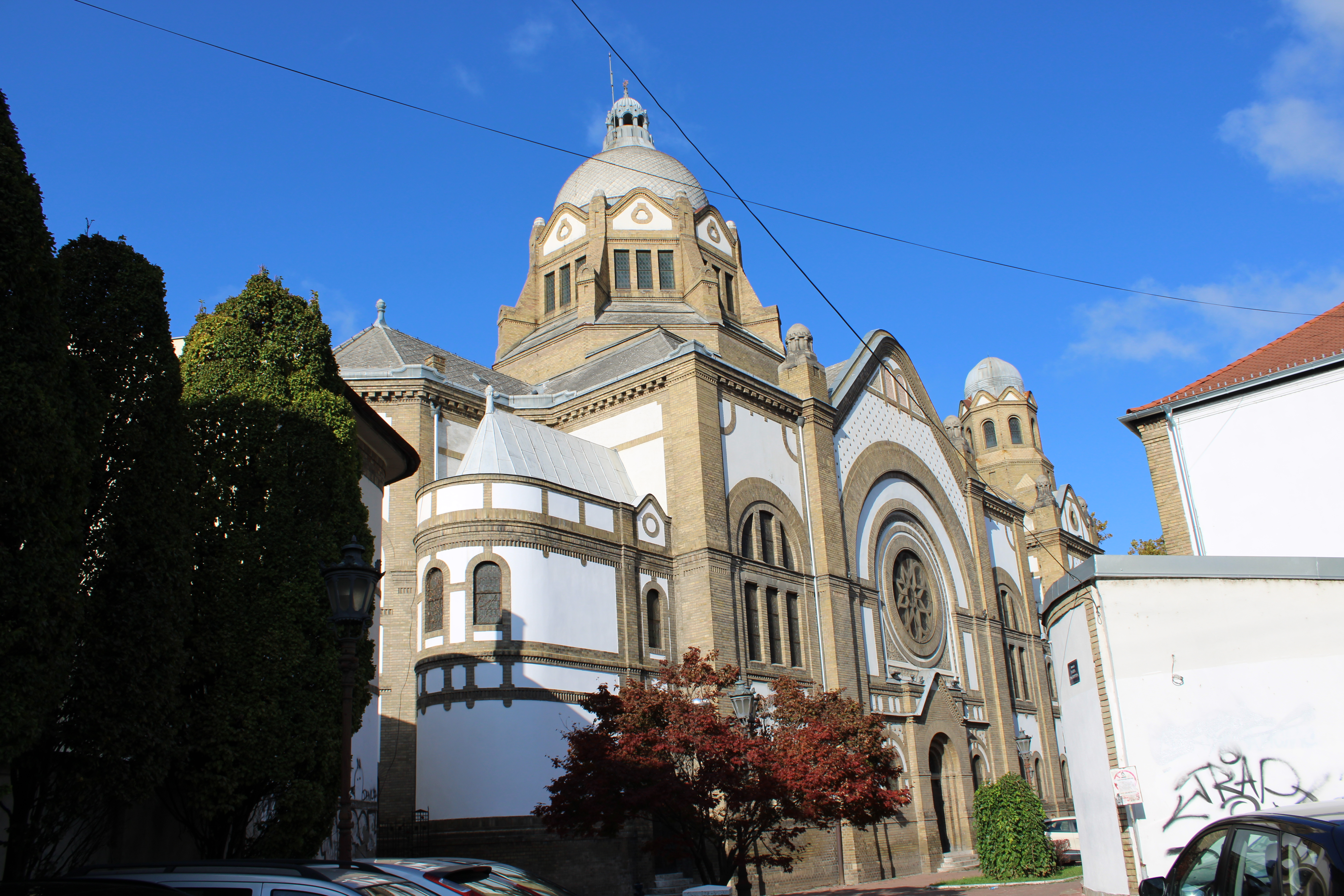
- Freedom Square with Novi Sad City Hall Matica srpska Petrovaradin Fortress Petrovaradin Clock Tower Name of Mary Church Saint George Cathedral Bishop's Palace Novi Sad Synagogue

- Flag Coat of arms Logo of Novi Sad
- Nickname: Serbian Athens
- Location within Serbia Location with Vojvodina Location within Europe
- Coordinates: 45°15′15″N 19°50′33″E
- Country: Serbia
- Province: Vojvodina
- District: South Bačka
- Settled by Scordisci: 4th century B.C.
- Founded: 1694
- City status: 1 February 1748; 278 years ago

Government
  - Mayor: Žarko Mićin (SNS)
  - Ruling parties: SNS/SDPS/SPO–SPS/JS–SVM

Area
  - City proper: 83 km^{2} (32 sq mi)
  - Urban: 222.66 km^{2} (85.97 sq mi)
  - Metro: 699 km^{2} (270 sq mi)
  - Rank: 36th in Serbia
- Elevation: 80 m (260 ft)

Population (2022)
  - City proper: 260,438
  - Rank: 2nd in Serbia
  - Density: 3,100/km^{2} (8,100/sq mi)
  - Urban: 325,511
  - Urban density: 1,461.9/km^{2} (3,786.4/sq mi)
  - Metro: 372,136
  - Metro density: 532/km^{2} (1,380/sq mi)
- Demonym(s): Novosađanin (Новосађанин, m.); Novosađanka (Новосађанка, f.) (sr)
- Time zone: UTC+01:00 (CET)
  - Summer (DST): UTC+02:00 (CEST)
- Postal code: 21000
- Area code: +381(0)21
- Vehicle registration: NS
- Official languages: Serbian together with Hungarian, Slovak and Pannonian Rusyn
- Website: novisad.rs

Novi Sad (Serbian Cyrillic: Нови Сад, pronounced [nôʋiː sâːd]; see § Etymology for other names) is the second-largest city in Serbia and the administrative center of the autonomous province of Vojvodina. It is located in the southern portion of the Pannonian Plain on the border of the Bačka and Syrmia geographical regions, lying on the banks of the Danube river, and facing the northern slopes of Fruška Gora. According to the 2022 census, the population of Novi Sad city proper stands at 260,438, its contiguous urban area has 325,511 inhabitants, and the population of its administrative area totals 372,136 people. It is the fifth largest city on the Danube river and the largest that is not a national capital.

Novi Sad was founded in 1694, when Serb merchants formed a colony across the Danube from the Petrovaradin Fortress, a strategic Habsburg military post. In subsequent centuries, it became an important trading, manufacturing and cultural centre, and has historically been dubbed the Serbian Athens. The city was heavily devastated in the 1848 Revolution, but was subsequently rebuilt and restored. Today, along with the Serbian capital city of Belgrade, Novi Sad is an industrial and financial center important to the Serbian economy.

Novi Sad was the European Youth Capital in 2019 and a European Capital of Culture in 2022. It became a UNESCO Creative City of Media Arts in 2023.

== Etymology ==
The name Novi Sad means "new plantation" in Serbian. Its Latin name, stemming from the establishment of Habsburg city rights, is Neoplanta. The official names of Novi Sad in local administration are:

- Serbian: Нови Сад / Novi Sad
- Hungarian: Újvidék
- Slovak: Nový Sad
- Pannonian Rusyn: Нови-Сад

In both Croatian and Romanian, which are official in provincial administration, the city is called Novi Sad. Historically, the city was called Neusatz and Neusatz an der Donau (translated as 'Novi Sad on the Danube') in German.

In its wider meaning, the name new plantation refers to the "City of Novi Sad", one of the city-level administrative units of Serbia, which includes Novi Sad proper on the left bank of the Danube, the towns of Sremska Kamenica and Petrovaradin on the right bank and the extensive suburbs of the left bank. Novi Sad can also refer strictly to only the urban areas of the city (Novi Sad proper and the towns of Sremska Kamenica and Petrovaradin), or only to the historical core on the left bank, i.e. Novi Sad proper excluding Sremska Kamenica and Petrovaradin.

== History ==
=== Older settlements ===
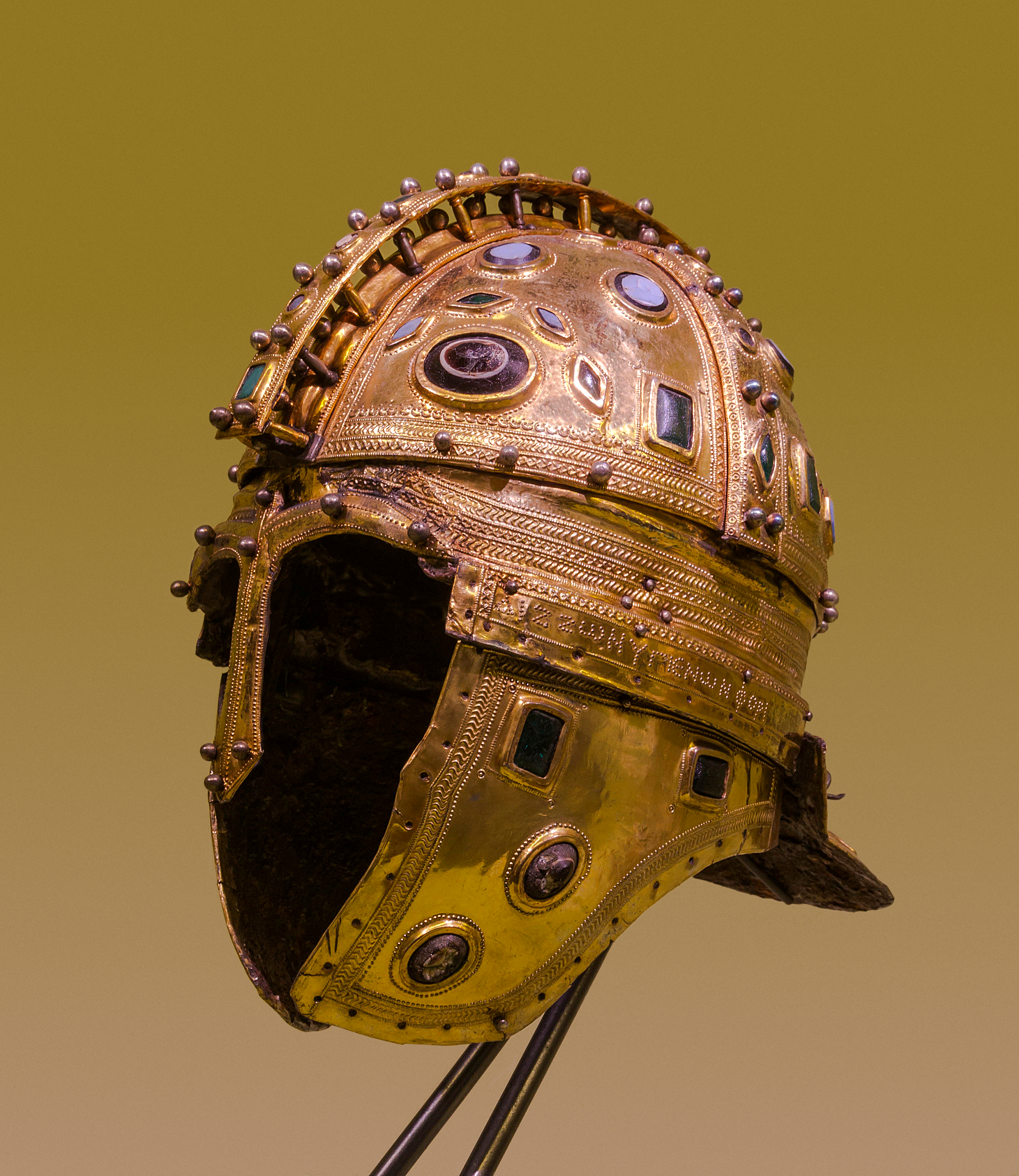
Roman golden helmet, Museum of Vojvodina

Historical affiliations

Principality of Hungary 895–1000
Kingdom of Hungary 1000–1526
Ottoman Empire 1526–1687
Habsburg monarchy 1694–1804
Austrian Empire 1804–1867
Austro-Hungarian Empire 1867–1918
Kingdom of Serbia 1918
Kingdom of Yugoslavia 1918–1941
Kingdom of Hungary 1941–1944
SFR Yugoslavia 1944–1992
Serbia and Montenegro 1992–2006
Republic of Serbia 2006–

Human habitation in the territory of present-day Novi Sad has been traced as far back as the Stone Age. Several settlements and necropolises dating to 5000 BC were unearthed during the construction of a new boulevard in Avijatičarsko Naselje. A settlement was also identified on the right bank of the river Danube in present-day Petrovaradin.

In antiquity, the region was inhabited by Celtic tribes, most notably the Scordisci. Celts had been present in the area since the 4th century BC and founded the first fortress on the right bank of the Danube. Later, in the 1st century BC, the region was conquered by the Romans. During Roman rule, a larger fortress was built in the 1st century, named Cusum, and included in the Roman province of Pannonia.

In the 5th century, Cusum was devastated by Hunnic invasions. By the end of the century, the Byzantines had rebuilt the town and called it Petrikon or Petrikov (Greek: Πέτρικον) after Saint Peter. Slavic tribes such as the Severians, the Obotrites and the Serbs (including the subtribes of the Braničevci and the Timočani) settled the region around Novi Sad, mainly in the 6th and 7th centuries. The Serbs absorbed the aforementioned Slavic groups as well as the Paleo-Balkanic peoples of the region.

In the Middle Ages, the area was controlled by the Ostrogoths, Gepids, Avars, Franks, West Slavic groups, again by the Byzantines, and finally by the Hungarians. It was a part of the medieval Kingdom of Hungary from its foundation in 1000 until the Ottoman invasion in the 16th century. Hungarians began to settle in the area, which before that time had been mostly populated by Slavs. The earliest known mention was as the Hungarian variant Peturwarad or Pétervárad (Serbian: Petrovaradin/Петроварадин), derived from the Byzantine variant, found in documents from 1237. That year, several other settlements were mentioned as existing in the territory of modern-day urban Novi Sad.

From the 13th century to the 16th century, the following settlements existed in the urban territory of the modern-day Novi Sad:

- on the right bank of the Danube: Pétervárad (Serbian: Petrovaradin) and Kamanc (Serbian: Kamenica).
- on the left bank of the Danube: Baksa or Baksafalva (Serbian: Bakša, Bakšić), Kűszentmárton (Serbian: Sent Marton), Bivalyos or Bivalo (Serbian: Bivaljoš, Bivalo), Vásárosvárad or Várad (Serbian: Vašaroš Varad, Varadinci), Zajol I (Serbian: Sajlovo I, Gornje Sajlovo, Gornje Isailovo), Zajol II (Serbian: Sajlovo II, Donje Sajlovo, Donje Isailovo), Bistritz (Serbian: Bistrica). Some other settlements existed in the suburbs of Novi Sad: Mortályos (Serbian: Mrtvaljoš), Csenei (Serbian: Čenej), Keménd (Serbian: Kamendin), Rév (Serbian: Rivica).

An etymology of settlement names reveals that some designations are of Slavic origin, which indicates that the areas were initially inhabited by Slavs, particularly the West Slavs. For example, Bivalo (Bivaljoš) had a large Slavic settlement dating from the 5th–6th centuries. Other names are of Hungarian origin (for example Bélakút, Kűszentmárton, Vásárosvárad, Rév), indicating that the settlements were inhabited by Hungarians before the Ottoman invasion in the 16th century. Some settlement names are of uncertain origin.

Tax records from 1522 show a mix of Hungarian and Slavic names among the inhabitants of these villages, including Slavic names like Bozso (Božo), Radovan, Radonya (Radonja), Ivo, etc. Following the Ottoman invasion in the 16th–17th centuries, some of these settlements were destroyed. Most of the surviving Hungarian inhabitants retreated from the area. Some of the settlements persisted under Ottoman rule and were populated by ethnic Serbs.

Between 1526 and 1687, the region was under Ottoman rule. In 1590, the population of all villages in the territory of present-day Novi Sad numbered 105 houses, inhabited exclusively by Serbs. Ottoman records mention only those who paid taxes, so the number of Serbs who lived in the area (for example, those that served in the Ottoman army) was likely larger than was recorded.

=== Founding of the city ===
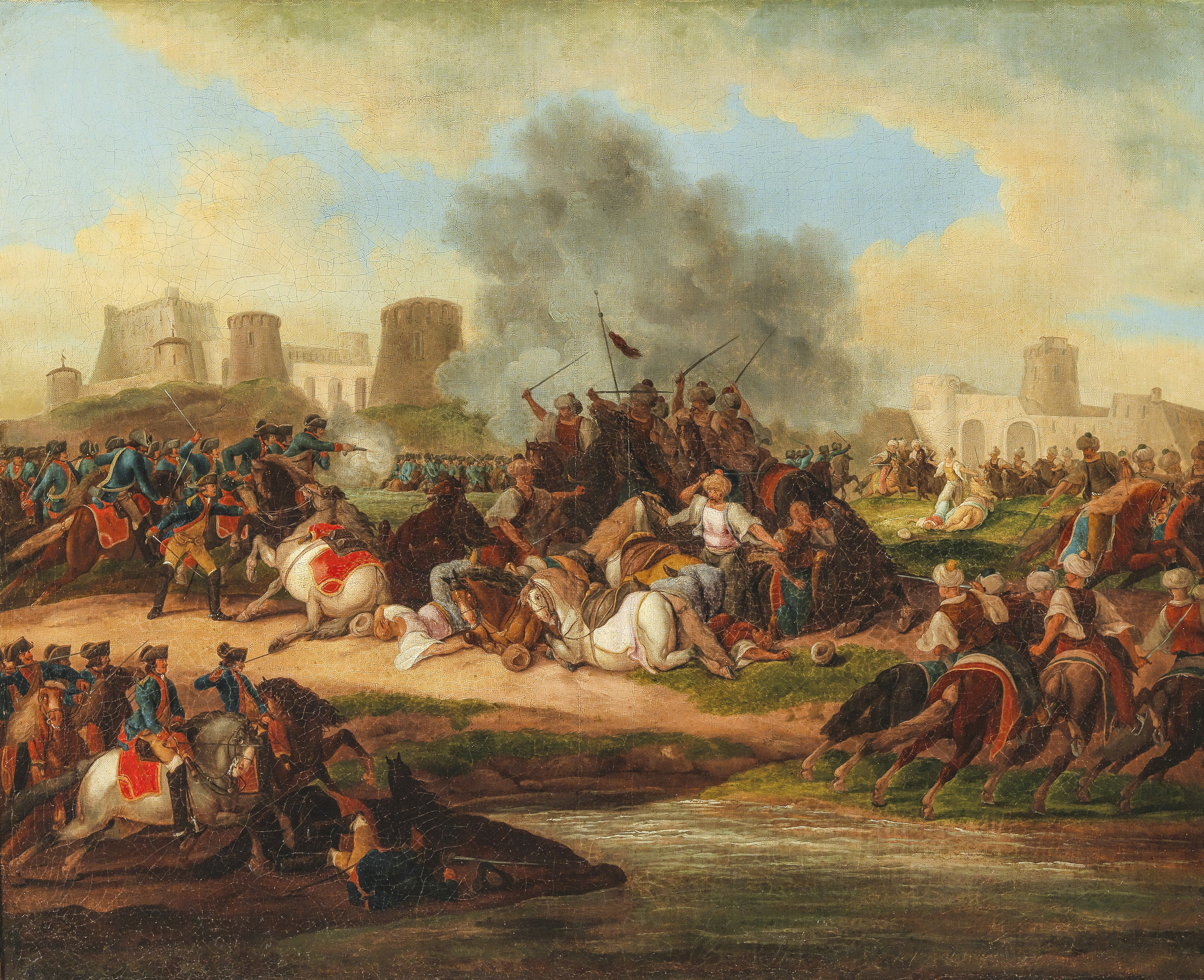
The Battle of Petrovaradin (1716) was a major clash between Habsburg and Ottoman forces, significant for halting Ottoman expansion into Central Europe and strengthening Habsburg control in the region.

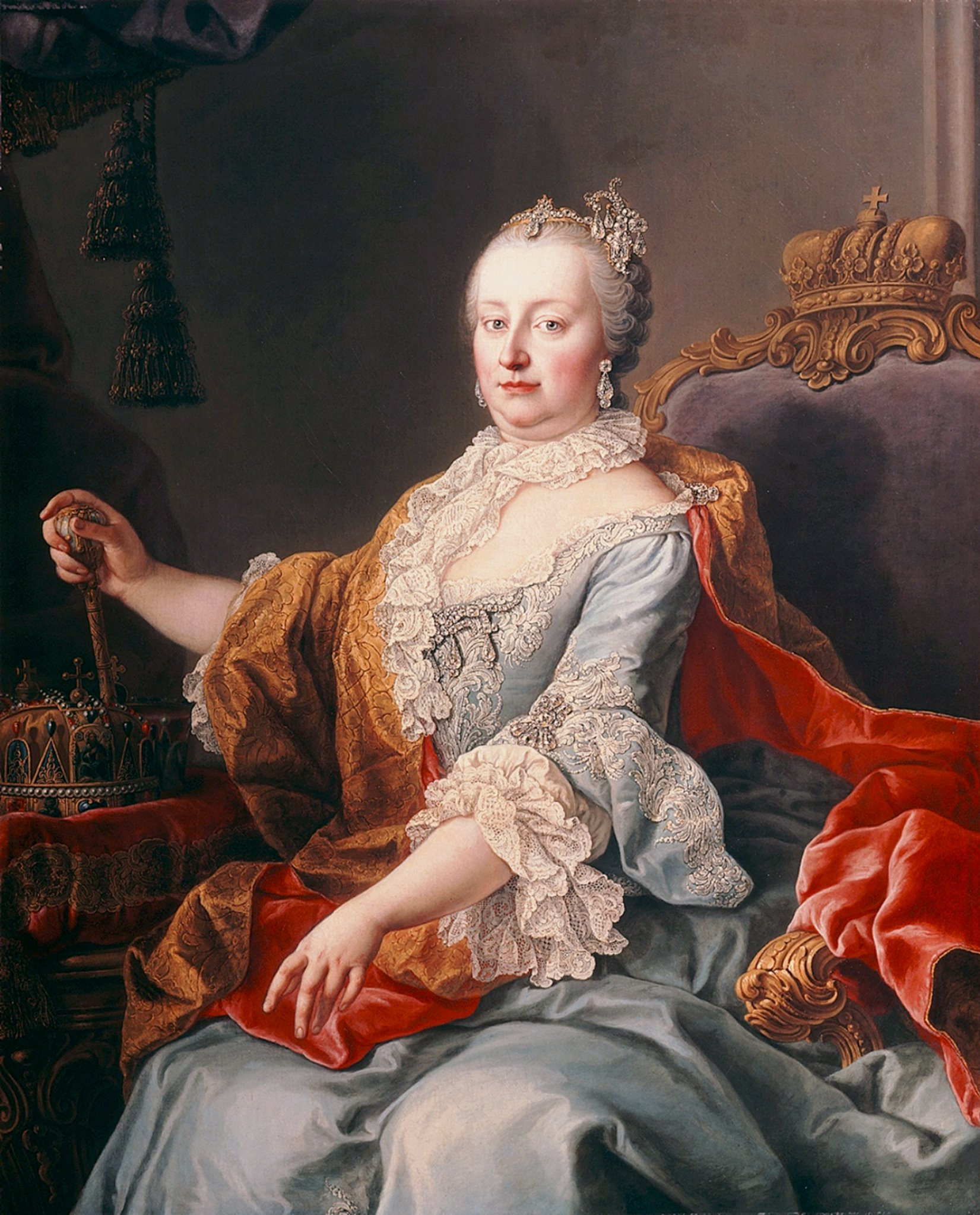
Habsburgs prohibited Orthodox Christians to settle in Petrovaradin. That policy pushed Serbs to form the Serb city which later became Novi Sad. The city was proclaimed to be a free royal city by Maria Theresa by 1748.

Habsburg rule was aligned with the Roman Catholic doctrine and, as it took over this area near the end of the 17th century, the government prohibited people of Orthodox faith from residing in Petrovaradin. Unable to build homes there, the Serbs of the area founded a new settlement in 1694 on the left bank of the Danube. They initially called it the 'Serb city' (Serbian: Srpski Grad, German: Ratzen Stadt). Another name used for the settlement was Petrovaradinski Šanac. In 1718, the inhabitants of the village of Almaš were resettled to Petrovaradinski Šanac, where they founded Almaški Kraj ('the Almaš quarter').

According to 1720 data, the population of Ratzen Stadt was composed of 112 Serbian, 14 German, and 5 Hungarian houses. The settlement officially gained the present names Novi Sad and Újvidék (Neoplanta in Latin) in 1748 when it became a 'free royal city', in German language it was called Neusatz.

The edict that made Novi Sad a 'free royal city' was proclaimed on 1 February 1748. The edict reads:

' We, Maria Theresa, by the grace of God Holy Roman Empress,
Queen of Hungary, Bohemia, Moravia, Dalmatia, Croatia, Slavonia, Rama, Serbia, Galicia, Lodomeria, Carinthia, [...]
cast this proclamation to anyone, whom it might concern... so that the renowned Petrovaradinski Šanac, which lies on the other side of the Danube in the Bačka province on the Sajlovo land, by the might of our divine royal power and prestige...make this town a Free Royal City and to fortify, accept and acknowledge it as one of the free royal cities of our Kingdom of Hungary and other territories, by abolishing its previous name of Petrovaradinski Šanac, renaming it Neoplanta (Latin), Új-Vidégh (Hungarian), Neusatz (German) and Novi Sad (Serbian) '

In the 18th century, the Habsburg monarchy recruited Germans from the southern principalities of the Holy Roman Empire to relocate to the Danube valley. They wanted both to increase the population and to redevelop the river valley for agriculture, which had declined markedly under the Ottomans. To encourage such settlement, the government ensured that the German communities could practice their religion (mostly Catholicism) and use their original German dialect.

=== Habsburg monarchy ===
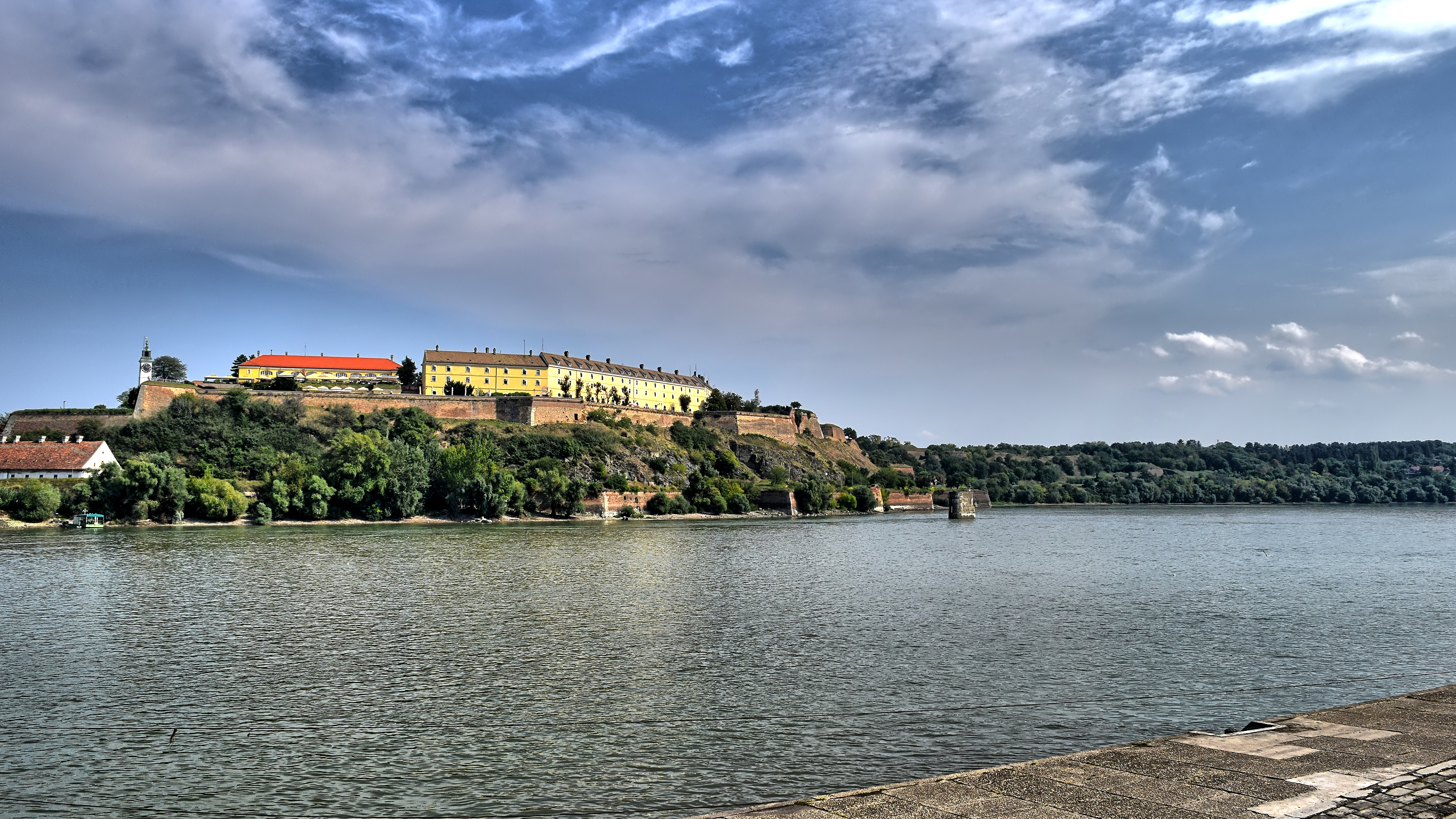
Petrovaradin fortress known as the "Gibraltar on the Danube," is a massive 18th-century, 112-hectare fortification in Serbia, renowned as one of Europe's best-preserved and second-largest, crucial for halting Ottoman expansion into the Europe in 1716.

For much of the 18th and 19th centuries, Novi Sad remained the largest city inhabited by Serbs. The reformer of the Serbian language, Vuk Stefanović Karadžić, wrote in 1817 that Novi Sad was the 'largest Serb municipality in the world'. It was a cultural and political centre for Serbs (see also Serbian Revival), who did not have their own national state at the time. Due to its cultural and political influence, the city became known as the 'Serbian Athens' (Srpska Atina in Serbian). According to 1843 data, Novi Sad had 17,332 inhabitants, of whom 9,675 were Orthodox Christians, 5,724 Catholics, 1,032 Protestants, 727 Jews, and 30 adherents of the Armenian church. The largest ethnic group in the city were Serbs, and the second largest were Germans.

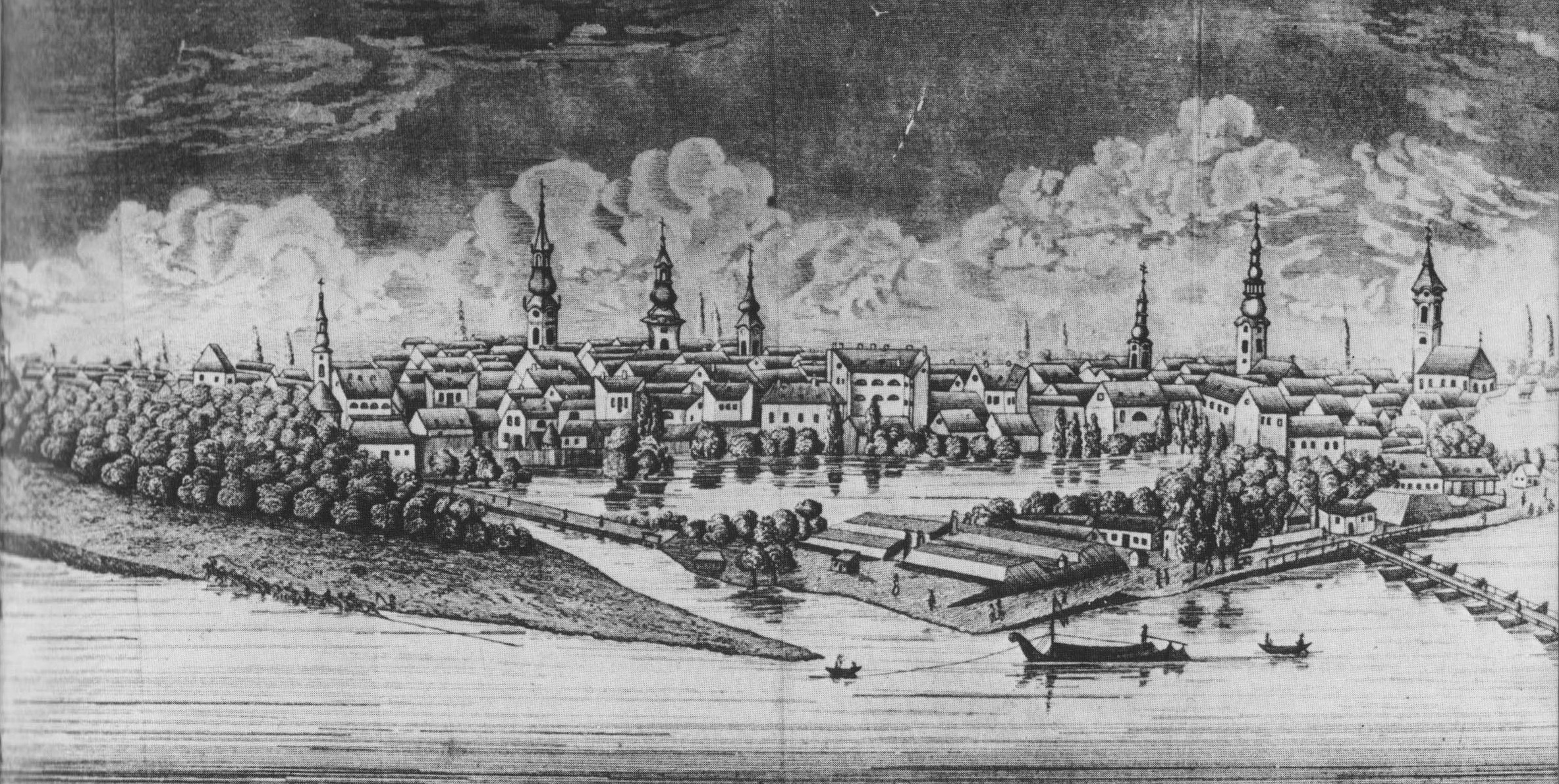
Novi Sad in the 19th century.

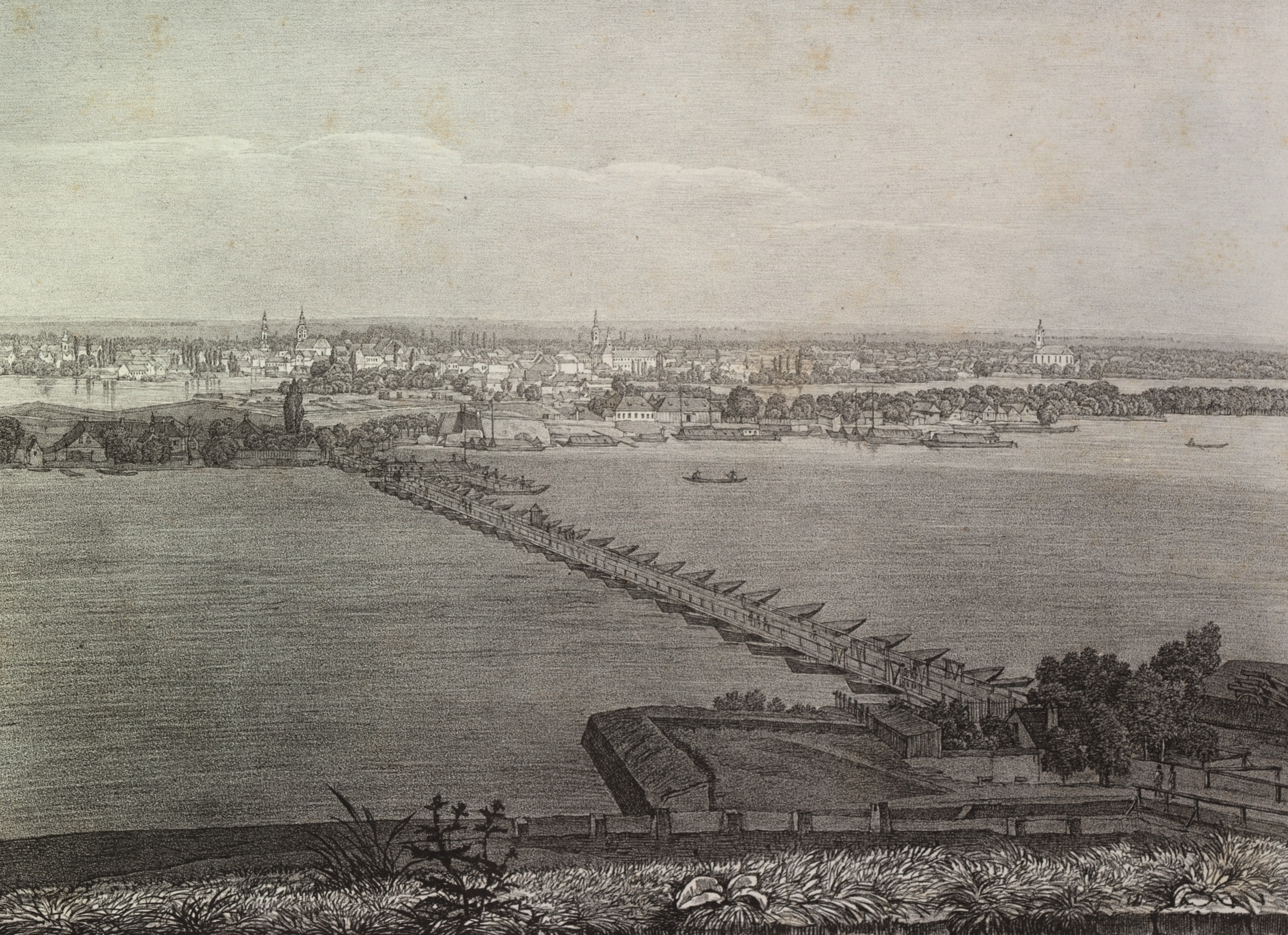
Lithograph of Novi Sad in 1826

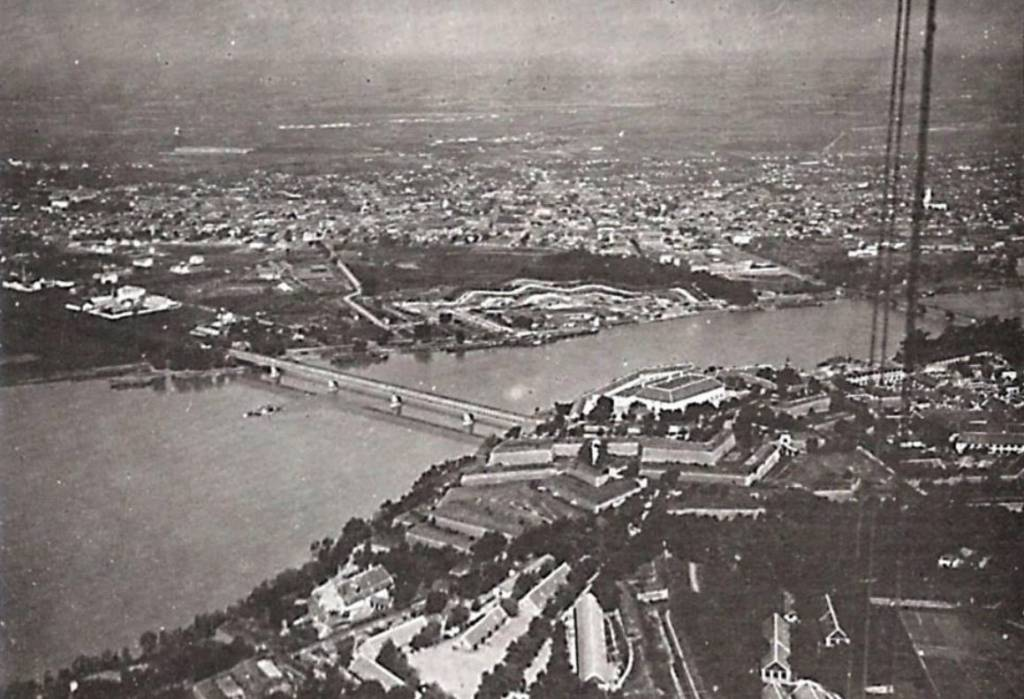
Novi Sad panoramic view, 1920s

During the Revolution of 1848–49, Novi Sad was part of Serbian Vojvodina, a Serbian autonomous region within the Austrian Empire. In 1849, the Hungarian garrison led by general Pál Kiss, located at the Petrovaradin Fortress, bombarded and devastated the city, which lost much of its population. According to the 1850 census, there were only 7,182 citizens left in the city, compared to 17,332 in 1843. Marija Trandafil and her husband paid for some of the rebuilding including two churches. Between 1849 and 1860, Novi Sad was part of a separate Austrian crownland known as the Voivodeship of Serbia and Banat of Temeschwar. After the abolishment of this province, the city was included into the Batsch-Bodrog County. The post office was opened in 1853. Following the compromise of 1867, Novi Sad was located within the Kingdom of Hungary, the Transleithania, which comprised half of the new Austro-Hungarian Empire. During this time, the Magyarization policy of the Hungarian government drastically altered the demographic structure of the city as the formerly predominantly Serbian population became one with a more mixed character. In 1880, 41.2% of the city's inhabitants used the Serbian language most frequently and 25.9% employed Hungarian. In the following decades, the percentage of Serbian-speakers decreased, while the number of Hungarian-speakers increased. According to the 1910 census, the city had 33,590 residents, of whom 13,343 (39.72%) spoke Hungarian, 11,594 (34.52%) Serbian, 5,918 (17.62%) German and 1,453 (4.33%) Slovak. It is not certain whether Hungarians or Serbs were the larger ethnic group in the city in 1910, since the various ethnic groups (Bunjevci, Romani, Jews, other South Slavic people, etc.) were classified in census results only according to the language they spoke.

Similar demographic changes can be seen in the religious structure: in 1870, the population of Novi Sad included 8,134 Orthodox Christians, 6,684 Catholics, 1,725 Calvinists, 1,343 Lutherans, and others. In 1910, the population included 13,383 Roman Catholics and 11,553 Orthodox Christians, while 3,089 declared themselves as Lutheran, 2,751 as Calvinist, and 2,326 as Jewish.

=== Serbia and Yugoslavia ===
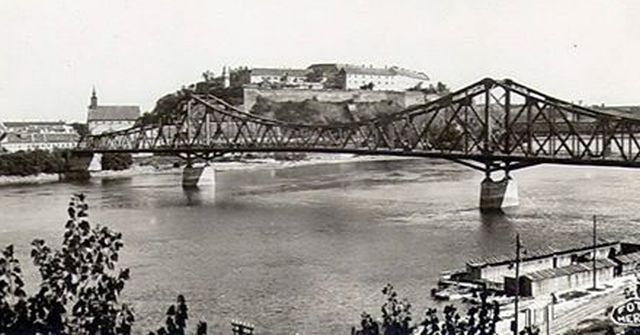
The Prince Tomislav Bridge in Novi Sad was a key Danube crossing built in the early 20th century and destroyed in 1941 during World War II.

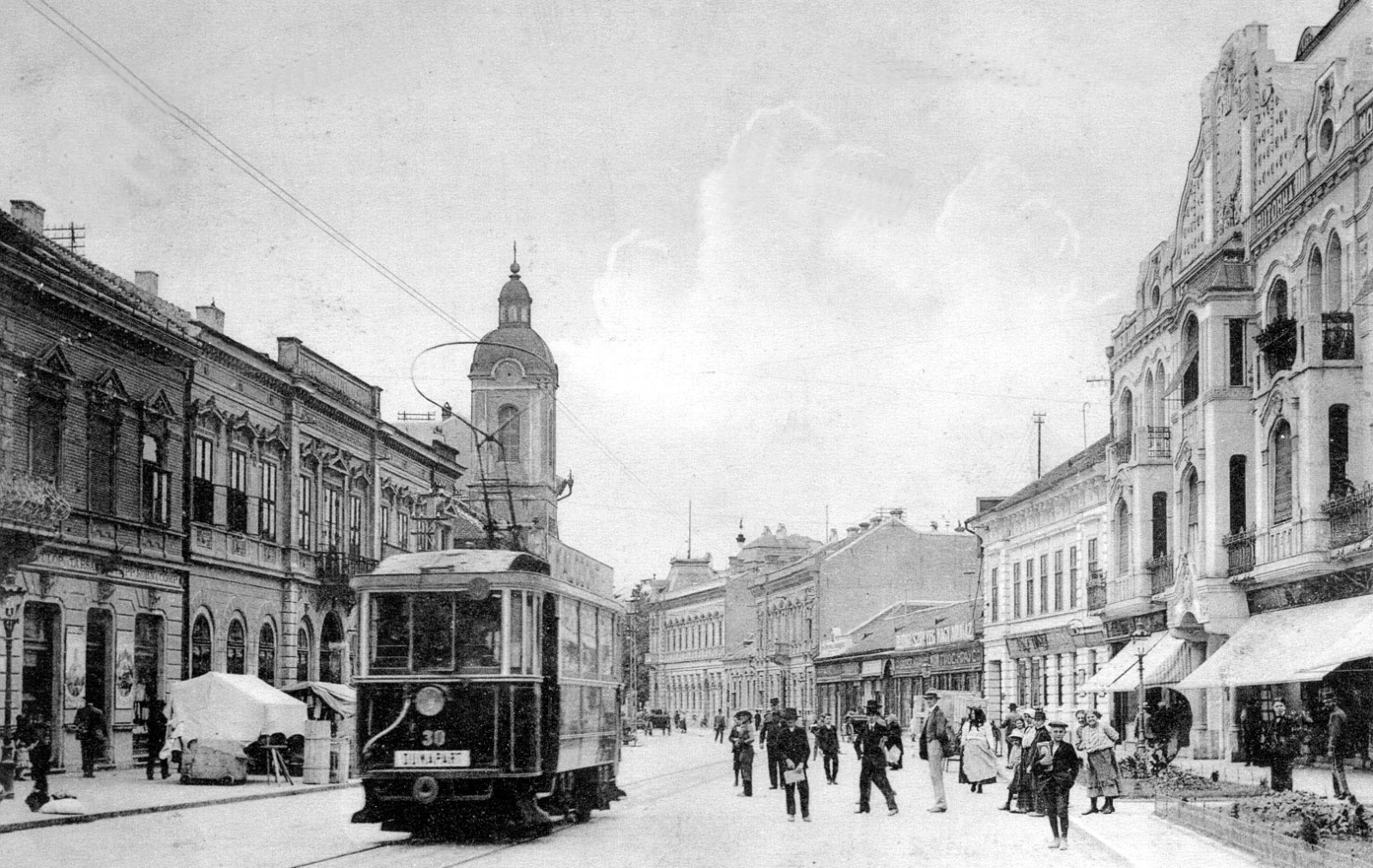
Trams in Novi Sad operated in the city from 1911 to 1958

On 25 November 1918, the Assembly of Serbs, Bunjevci and other Slavs of Vojvodina in Novi Sad proclaimed the union of the region of Vojvodina with the Kingdom of Serbia. From 1 December 1918, Novi Sad was part of the Kingdom of Serbs, Croats, and Slovenes; and in 1929, it became the capital of the Danube Banovina, a province of the newly named Kingdom of Yugoslavia. In 1921, the population of Novi Sad numbered 39,122 inhabitants, 16,293 of whom spoke the Serbian language, 12,991 Hungarian, 6,373 German, 1,117 Slovak, etc.

In 1941, Yugoslavia was invaded and partitioned by the Axis powers, and its northern parts, including Novi Sad, were annexed by Hungary. During World War II, about 5,000 citizens were murdered and many others were resettled. During the three days of the Novi Sad raid (21–23 January 1942) alone, Hungarian police killed 1,246 citizens, among them more than 800 Jews, and threw their corpses into the icy waters of the Danube.

The total death toll of the raid was around 2,500. Citizens of all nationalities—Serbs, Hungarians, Slovaks, and others—fought together against the Axis authorities. In 1975 the whole city was awarded the title People's Hero of Yugoslavia.

The Yugoslav Partisans of Syrmia and Bačka entered the city on 23 October 1944. During the military administration of Banat, Bačka and Baranja (17 October 1944 – 27 January 1945), the Partisans killed tens of thousands, mostly Serbs, Germans, and Hungarians, who were perceived as opponents to the new regime.

Novi Sad became part of the new Socialist Federal Republic of Yugoslavia. Since 1945, Novi Sad has been the capital of Vojvodina, a province of the Republic of Serbia. The city went through rapid industrialization and its population more than doubled in the period between World War II and the breakup of Yugoslavia in the early 1990s.

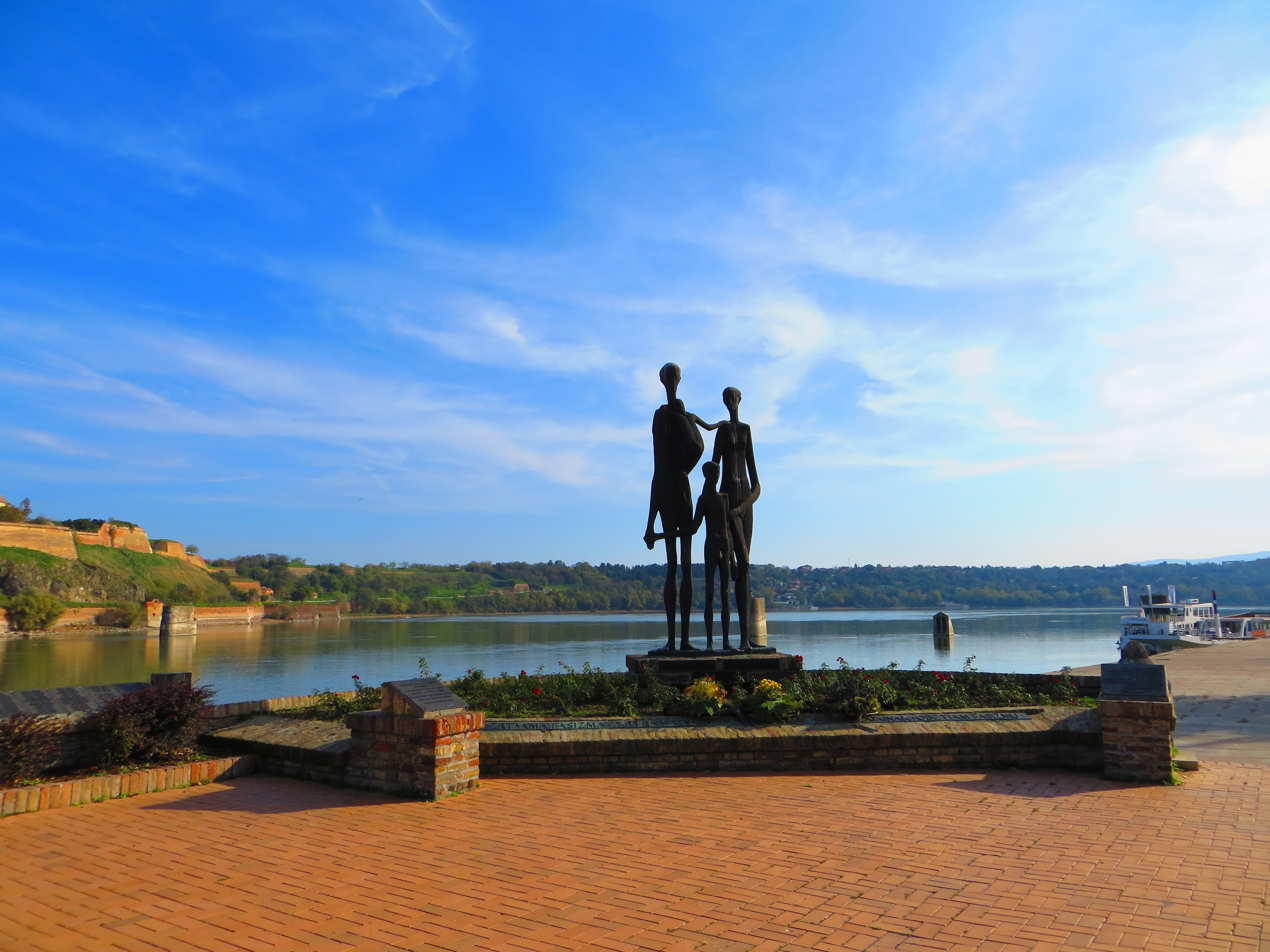
The Family by Jovan Soldatović, Monument dedicated to the victims of the Novi Sad raid, which took place during the Hungarian occupation in WWII.

After 1992, Novi Sad became a part of the Federal Republic of Yugoslavia. Devastated by NATO bombardment during the Kosovo War of 1999, Novi Sad was left without any of its three Danube bridges (Žeželj Bridge, Varadin Bridge and Liberty Bridge), communications, water, and electricity. Residential areas were cluster-bombed several times while the oil refinery was bombarded daily, causing severe pollution and widespread ecological damage. In 2003, FR Yugoslavia was transformed into the state union of Serbia and Montenegro. These two states separated in June 2006 (following the May 2006 Montenegrin independence referendum), leaving Novi Sad part of the Republic of Serbia.

On 1 November 2024, the canopy of the main railway station in Novi Sad collapsed, killing sixteen people. The incident sparked a series of mass protests against government corruption.

During 2025, one million square meters of residential space were under construction simultaneously in Novi Sad, making the city the largest construction site in Serbia.

== Geography ==
A view over the cityscape, featuring the statue of Mercury atop the Central Credit Institute Building at Grčkoškolska Street in the foreground.

The city lies on the meander of the river Danube, which is only 350 meters wide beneath the marking stones of Petrovaradin. A section of the Danube-Tisza-Danube Canal marks the northern edge of the wider city centre. The main part of the city lies on the left bank of the Danube in the region of Bačka, while the smaller settlements of Petrovaradin and Sremska Kamenica lie on the right bank, in the region of Srem (Syrmia). The section situated on the left bank of the river lies on one of the southernmost and lowest parts of the Pannonian Plain, while Fruška Gora on the right bank is a horst mountain. Alluvial plains along the Danube are well-formed, especially on the left bank, and in some parts 10 kilometres (6 miles) from the river. A large part of Novi Sad lies on a fluvial terrace with an elevation of between 80 and 83 metres (262 and 272 feet). The northern part of Fruška Gora is composed of massive landslide zones, although they are largely inactive with the exception of the Ribnjak neighbourhood between Sremska Kamenica and Petrovaradin Fortress.

The total land area of the city is 699 square kilometres (270 sq mi), while its urban area spans 129.7 km^{2} (50 sq mi).

=== Climate ===
Novi Sad has a humid subtropical climate (Köppen climate classification: Cfa) closely bordering on humid continental climate (Dfa) with a January mean of 0.7 °C (33.3 °F). The city experiences four distinct seasons. Autumn is drier than spring, with long sunny and warm periods. Winter is not so severe, with an average of 22 days of complete sub-zero temperature, and averages 22 days of snowfall. January is the coldest month, with an average low of −2.5 °C (27.5 °F). Spring is usually short and rainy, while summer arrives abruptly. The coldest temperature ever recorded in Novi Sad was −30.7 °C (−23.3 °F) on 24 January 1963, and the hottest temperature ever recorded was 41.6 °C (106.9 °F) on 24 July 2007.

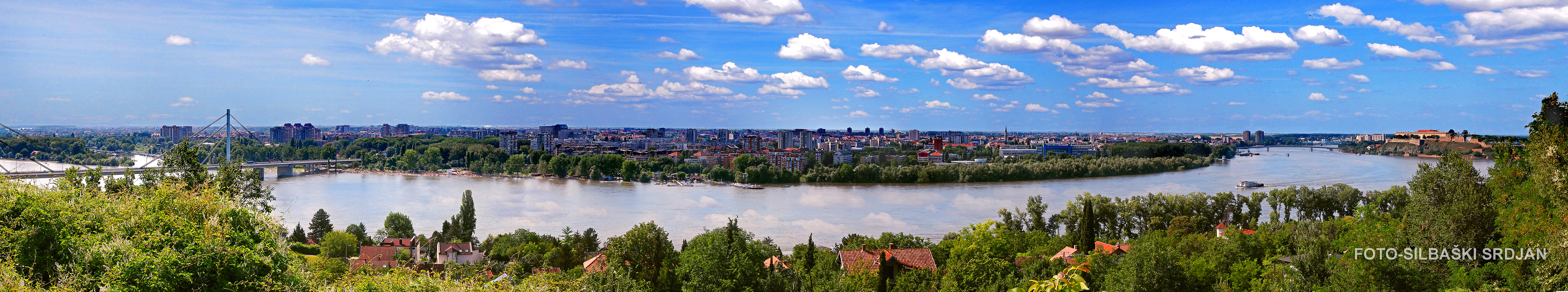
Panoramic view from the Petrovaradin Fortress

The east-southeasterly wind, known as Košava, blows from the Carpathians and brings clear and dry weather. It mostly blows in autumn and winter, in 2 to 3-day intervals. The average speed of Košava is 25 to 43 km/h (16 to 27 mph), but gusts can sometimes reach up to 130 km/h (81 mph). In wintertime, accompanied by snow storms, the winds can cause large snow-drifts.

Climate data for Rimski Šančevi, Novi Sad (1991–2020, extremes 1948–present)
Month	Jan	Feb	Mar	Apr	May	Jun	Jul	Aug	Sep	Oct	Nov	Dec	Year
Record high °C (°F)	18.9 (66.0)	22.4 (72.3)	30.0 (86.0)	31.5 (88.7)	34.2 (93.6)	37.6 (99.7)	41.6 (106.9)	40.2 (104.4)	37.4 (99.3)	30.1 (86.2)	26.9 (80.4)	21.0 (69.8)	41.6 (106.9)
Mean daily maximum °C (°F)	4.3 (39.7)	6.9 (44.4)	12.7 (54.9)	18.4 (65.1)	23.1 (73.6)	26.6 (79.9)	28.8 (83.8)	29.2 (84.6)	23.9 (75.0)	18.3 (64.9)	11.5 (52.7)	5.1 (41.2)	17.4 (63.3)
Daily mean °C (°F)	0.7 (33.3)	2.3 (36.1)	7.0 (44.6)	12.4 (54.3)	17.3 (63.1)	20.9 (69.6)	22.5 (72.5)	22.4 (72.3)	17.2 (63.0)	12.0 (53.6)	6.8 (44.2)	1.8 (35.2)	11.9 (53.4)
Mean daily minimum °C (°F)	−2.5 (27.5)	−1.7 (28.9)	1.9 (35.4)	6.6 (43.9)	11.4 (52.5)	14.9 (58.8)	16.1 (61.0)	16.1 (61.0)	11.8 (53.2)	7.3 (45.1)	3.2 (37.8)	−1.2 (29.8)	7.0 (44.6)
Record low °C (°F)	−30.7 (−23.3)	−28.6 (−19.5)	−19.9 (−3.8)	−6.2 (20.8)	−0.4 (31.3)	0.2 (32.4)	5.4 (41.7)	6.9 (44.4)	−1.6 (29.1)	−6.4 (20.5)	−13.8 (7.2)	−24.0 (−11.2)	−30.7 (−23.3)
Average precipitation mm (inches)	38.9 (1.53)	36.4 (1.43)	38.6 (1.52)	46.6 (1.83)	77.3 (3.04)	92.2 (3.63)	68.1 (2.68)	59.7 (2.35)	58.8 (2.31)	58.6 (2.31)	51.5 (2.03)	49.1 (1.93)	675.8 (26.61)
Average precipitation days (≥ 0.1 mm)	12.1	10.5	10.6	11.2	13.4	11.1	9.9	8.1	10.1	10.1	10.8	12.9	130.8
Average snowy days	6.4	5.8	2.7	0.4	0.0	0.0	0.0	0.0	0.0	0.1	1.9	4.9	22.2
Average relative humidity (%)	85.5	80.2	70.8	64.4	67.9	69.7	68.2	67.4	72.5	77.1	82.1	86.7	74.5
Mean monthly sunshine hours	67.9	100.6	164.1	205.8	257.3	284.8	316.2	298.9	207.1	160.9	94.7	59.4	2,217.7
Source 1: Republic Hydrometeorological Service of Serbia (RHMZ) and NOAA
Source 2: Meteo Climat (record highs and lows)

== Settlements ==
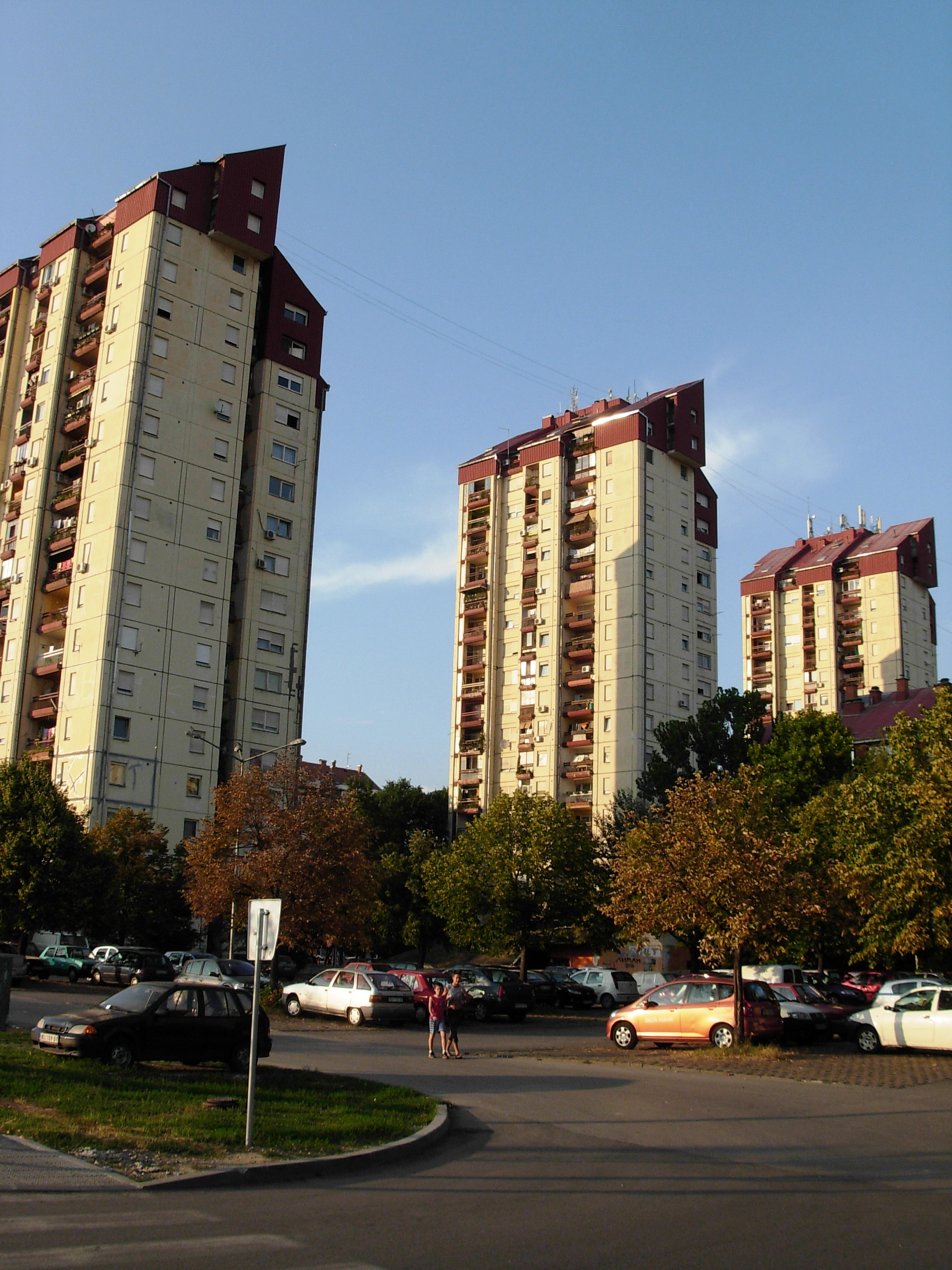
Residential towers in Liman district

Novi Sad is a typical Central European town in terms of its architecture. The Town Hall and the Court House were built by Emmerich Kitzweger (1868–1917). During the 1848/1849 revolution, the town was heavily bombed. One third of all houses were destroyed and the city's population was reduced to half. Architecture from the 19th century dominates the city centre. Small, older houses used to surround the centre of town, but they are now being replaced by modern, multi-story buildings.

During the socialist period, new city blocks with wide streets and multi-story buildings were constructed around the city core. However, not many communist-style high-rise buildings were erected. The total number of apartment buildings, with ten or more floors, remained at about 50, the rest having mostly three to six floors. From 1962 to 1964, a new boulevard, today called Bulevar oslobođenja, was cut through the older neighbourhoods, establishing major communication lines. Several more boulevards were subsequently built in a similar manner, creating an orthogonal network which replaced the primarily radial structure of the old town. These interventions paved the way for a relatively unhampered growth of the city, which has almost tripled in population since the 1950s. Despite a huge increase in car ownership, traffic congestion is still relatively mild, apart from a few major arteries.

=== Neighbourhoods ===
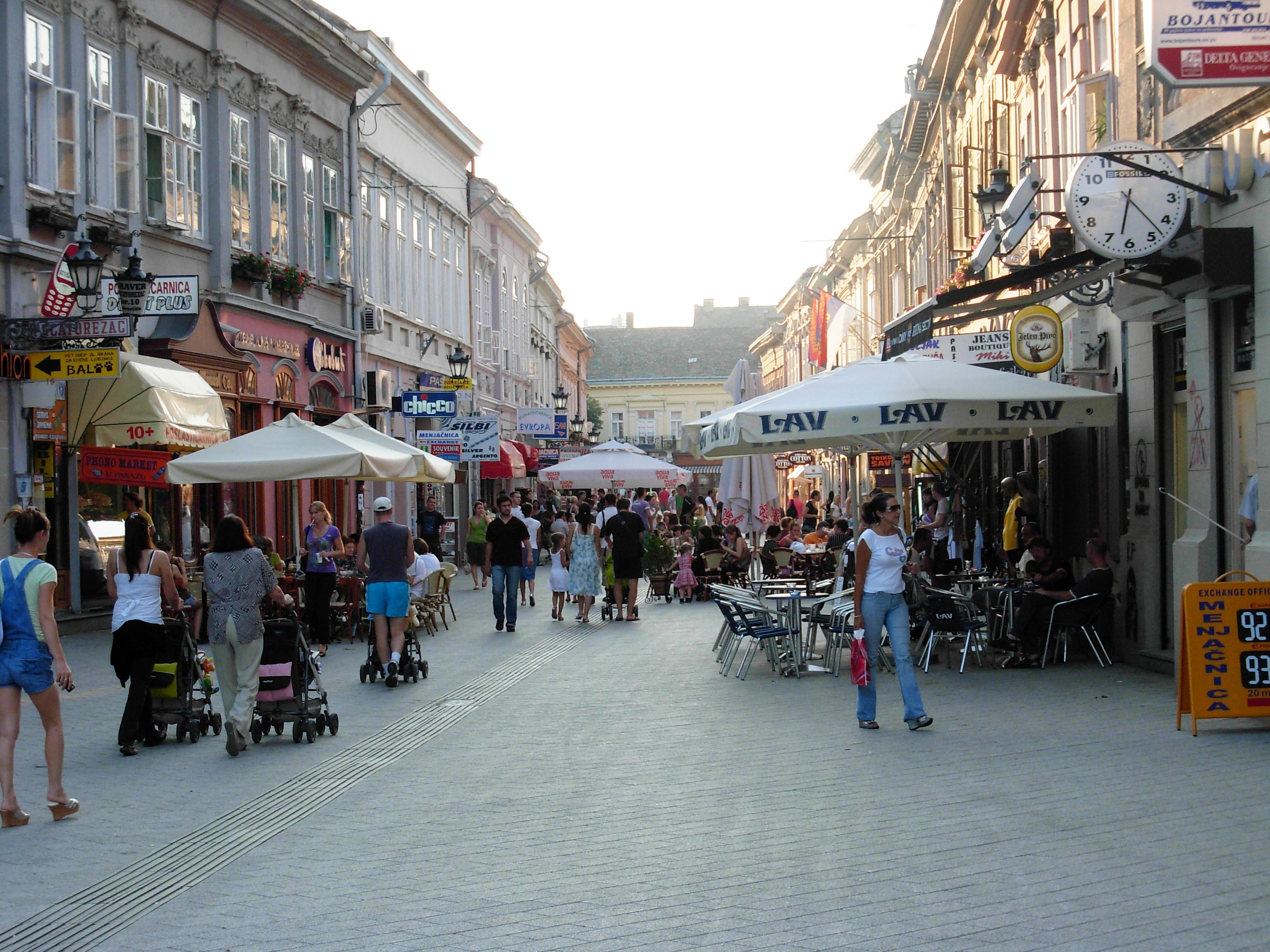
Dunavska street in Stari Grad

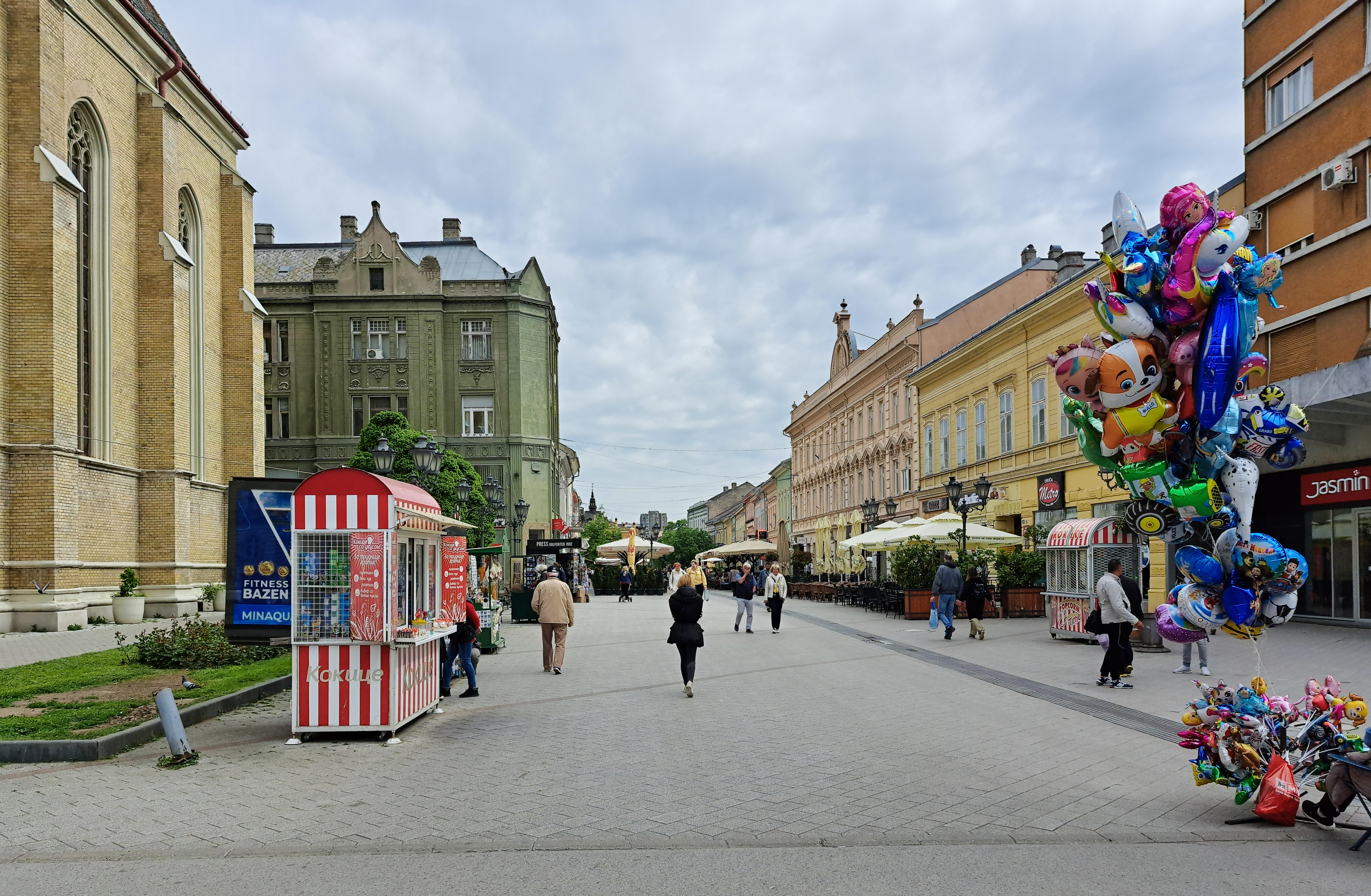
Zmajeva street in Stari Grad

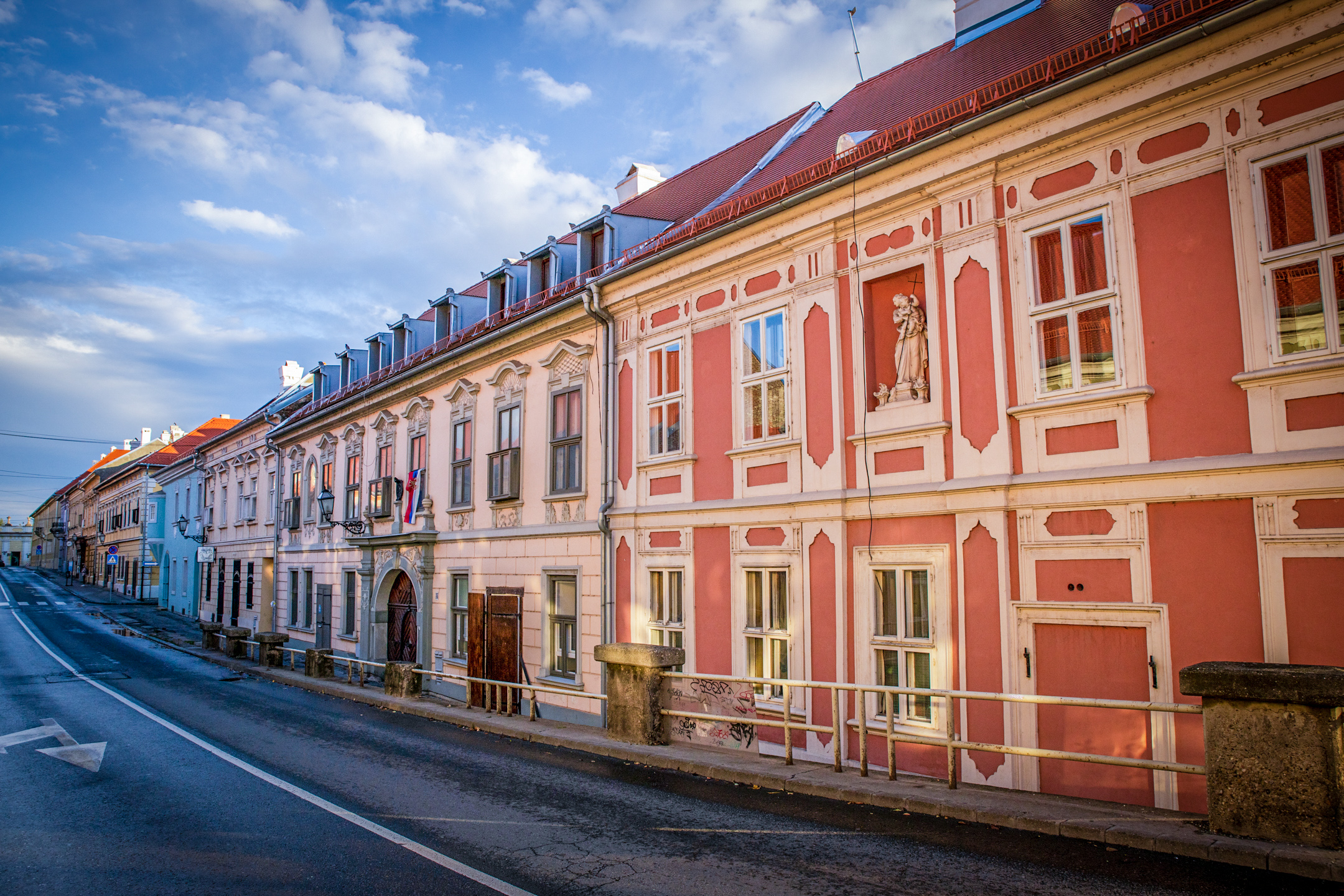
Beogradska street in Petrovaradin

Some of the oldest neighbourhoods in the city are Stari Grad (Old Town), Rotkvarija, Podbara, and Salajka. The areas of Sremska Kamenica and Petrovaradin, located on the right bank of the Danube, were separate towns in the past, but today belong to the urban area of Novi Sad. Liman, as well as Bistrica, are neighbourhoods built during the 1960s, 1970s and 1980s, with contemporary style buildings and wide boulevards (Liman was divided into four sections, numbered I–IV).

New neighbourhoods, like Liman, Detelinara, and Bistrica, emerged from the fields and forests surrounding the city. Following World War II, tall residential buildings were constructed to house the huge influx of people leaving the country side. Many old houses in the city centre, from the Rotkvarija and Bulevar neighbourhoods, were torn down in the 1950s and 1960s, to be replaced by multi-story buildings. Since the city has experienced a major construction boom in the last 10 years, some neighbourhoods have completely been transformed.

Neighbourhoods with single-family homes are mostly located away from the city centre. Telep, situated in the southwest, and Klisa, in the north, are the oldest such neighborhoods. Adice and Veternik, both located west of the downtown area, have significantly expanded during the last 15 years, partly due to the influx of Serbian refugees fleeing the Yugoslav wars.

=== Suburbs ===
Some 43,000 inhabitants or 11.7% of the administrative city's total population resides in the 11 rural settlements, outside its urban area. Ledinci, Stari Ledinci, and Bukovac are all located on Fruška Gora slopes, with Stari Ledinci being the most isolated and least populated village. Towns and villages in the adjacent municipalities of Sremski Karlovci, Temerin, and Beočin share the same public transportation system and are economically tied to Novi Sad.

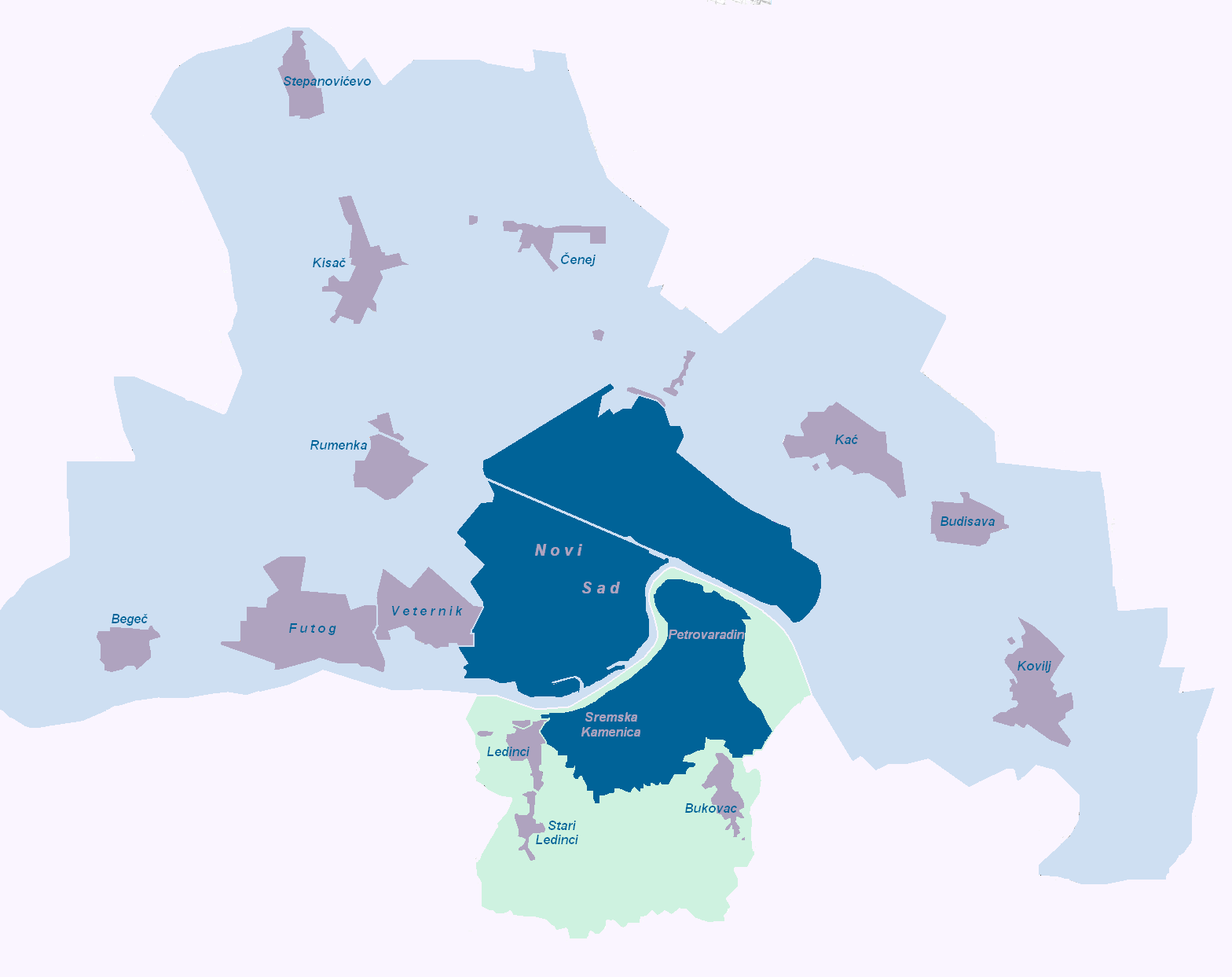
Novi Sad and its suburbs

Name	Population
Begeč	3,005
Budisava	3,107
Bukovac	3,636
Čenej	1,942
Futog	18,011
Kać	11,067
Kisač	4,511
Kovilj	5,151
Ledinci	1,864
Rumenka	6,300
Stari Ledinci	985
Stepanovićevo	1,848
Veternik	18,849

== Demographics ==
Historical population
Year	Pop.	±%
1848	18,530	—
1900	28,763	+55.2%
1910	33,089	+15.0%
1921	39,122	+18.2%
1931	63,985	+63.6%
1941	61,731	−3.5%
1948	69,760	+13.0%
1953	76,752	+10.0%
1961	102,469	+33.5%
1971	141,375	+38.0%
1981	170,020	+20.3%
1991	179,626	+5.6%
2002	191,405	+6.6%
2011	231,798	+21.1%
2022	260,438	+12.4%

Novi Sad is the second largest city in Serbia, after Belgrade, and the largest city in Vojvodina. Its contiguous urban area (which include Novi Sad proper and adjacent settlements of Petrovaradin, Sremska Kamenica, Veternik, and Futog) has population of 325,551 inhabitants. Population of the administrative area of the city of Novi Sad stands at 368,967 inhabitants.

Since its founding, the population of the city has been constantly increasing, and in the last three decades in particular, it experienced rapid population growth. According to the 2022 census, 50.8% of the population of Novi Sad was not native to the city: 30.3% migrated to Novi Sad from rest of Serbia, 17.1% came from countries of former Yugoslavia (predominately Serbs from Bosnia and Herzegovina, Croatia, and Montenegro), while some 3.4% came from other countries.

=== Ethnic structure ===
Urban area of Novi Sad and all settlements in the city administrative area have an overwhelming ethnic Serb majority, with the exception of Kisač, which has an ethnic Slovak majority. The ethnic structure of population of Novi Sad administrative area (according to the 2022 census):

Ethnicity	Population	Share
Serbs	289,119	78.3%
Hungarians	9,792	2.6%
Slovaks	5,458	1.4%
Croats	3,877	1%
Yugoslavs	3,465	0.9%
Roma	3,321	0.9%
Russians	2,766	0.7%
Montenegrins	2,225	0.6%
Rusyns	1,836	0.5%
Others	7,799	2.1%
Regional identity	4,072	1.1%
Undeclared	14,585	3.9%
Unknown	20,652	5.6%

=== Religious structure ===
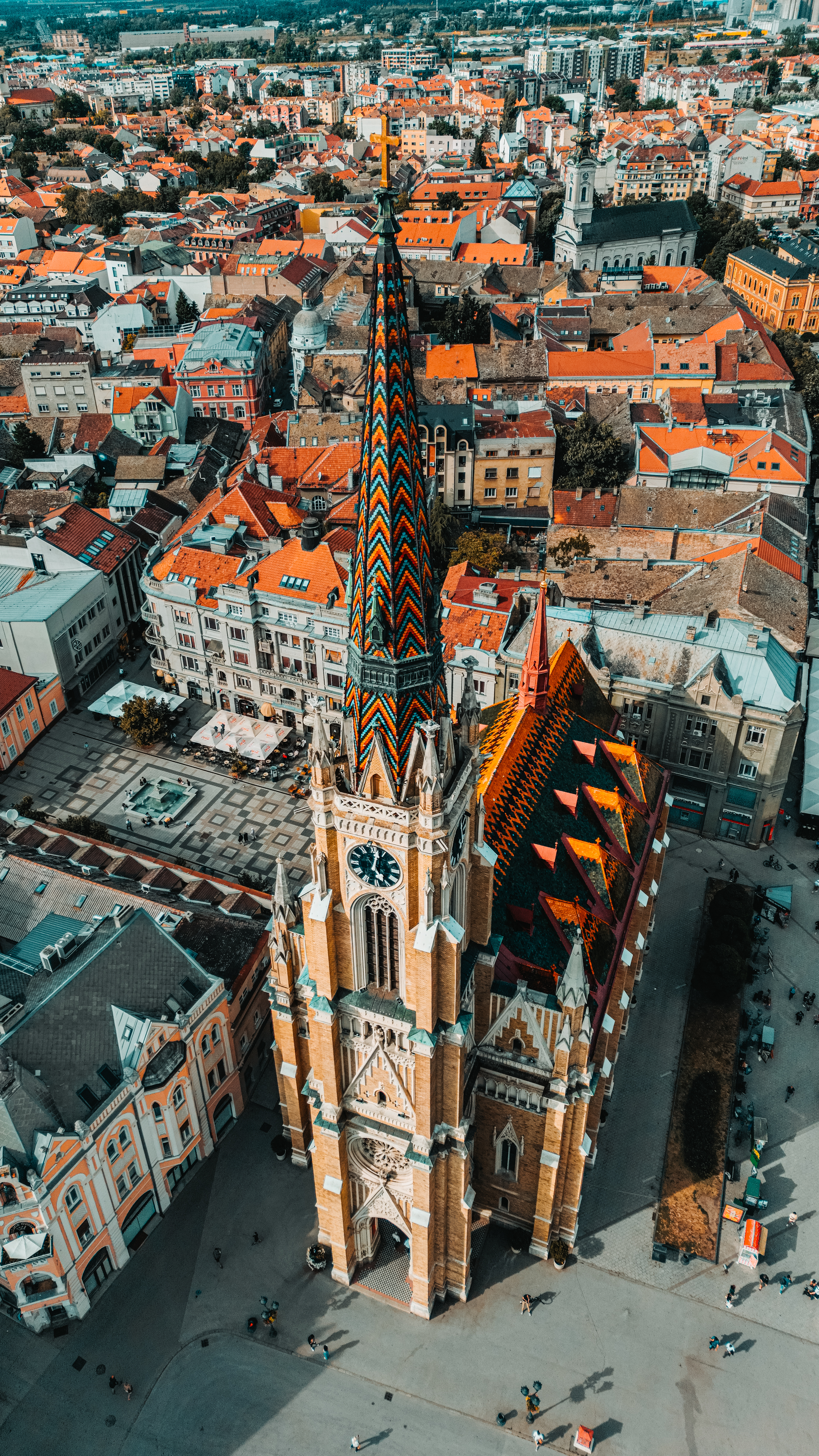
Name of Mary Catholic Church (in the foreground) and the Saint George Orthodox Cathedral (in the background)

Religious structure of population of the Novi Sad administrative area (according to the 2022 census):

Religion	Adherents	Share
Orthodox	282,829	76.6%
Catholic	15,822	4.3%
Protestant	6,567	1.7%
Muslim	4,870	1.3%
Judaism	66	0.01%
Atheist	10,945	2.9%
Agnostic	1,260	0.3%
Undeclared	19,461	5.2%
Unknown	24,156	6.5%

== Culture ==
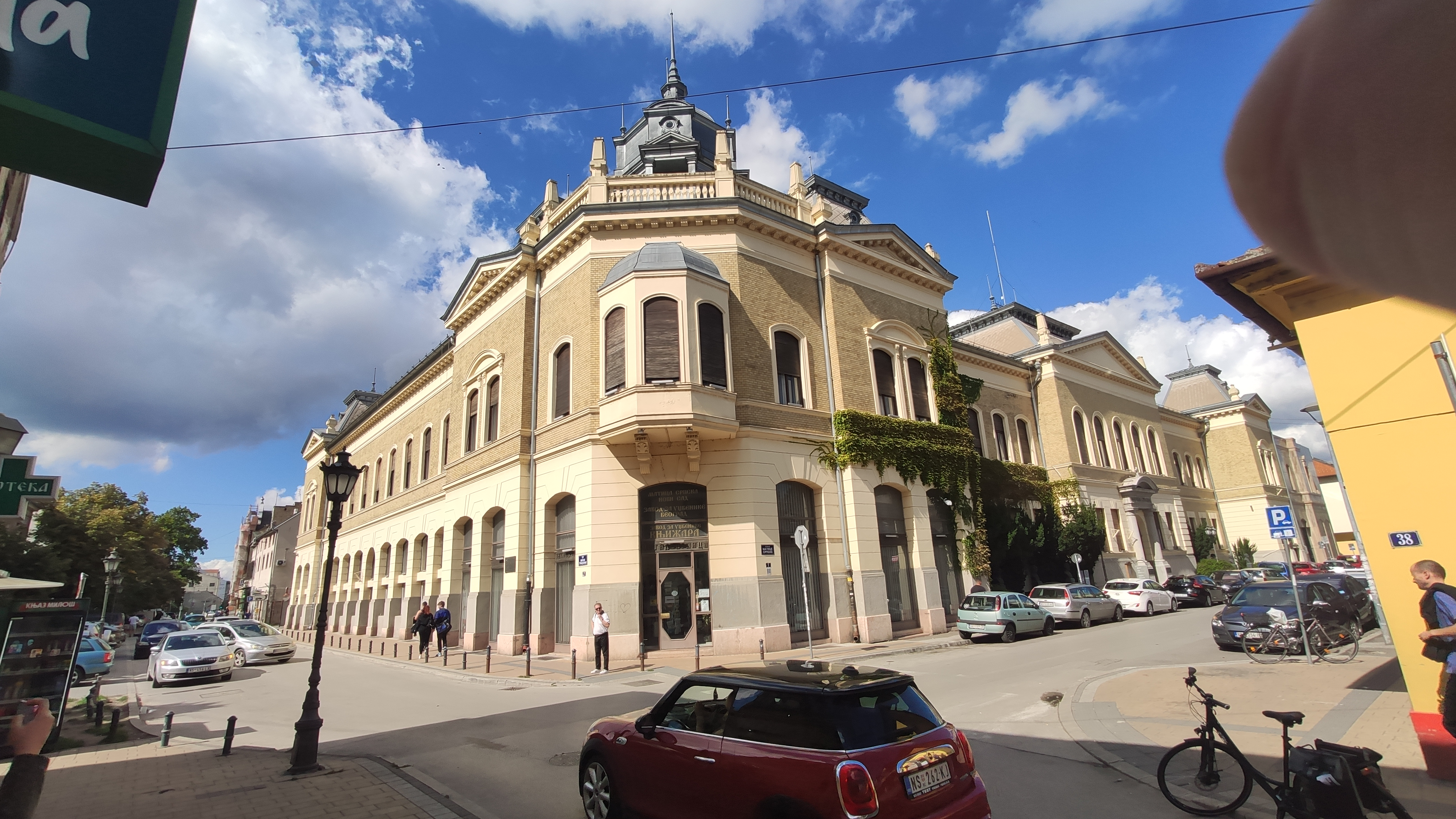
Matica Srpska

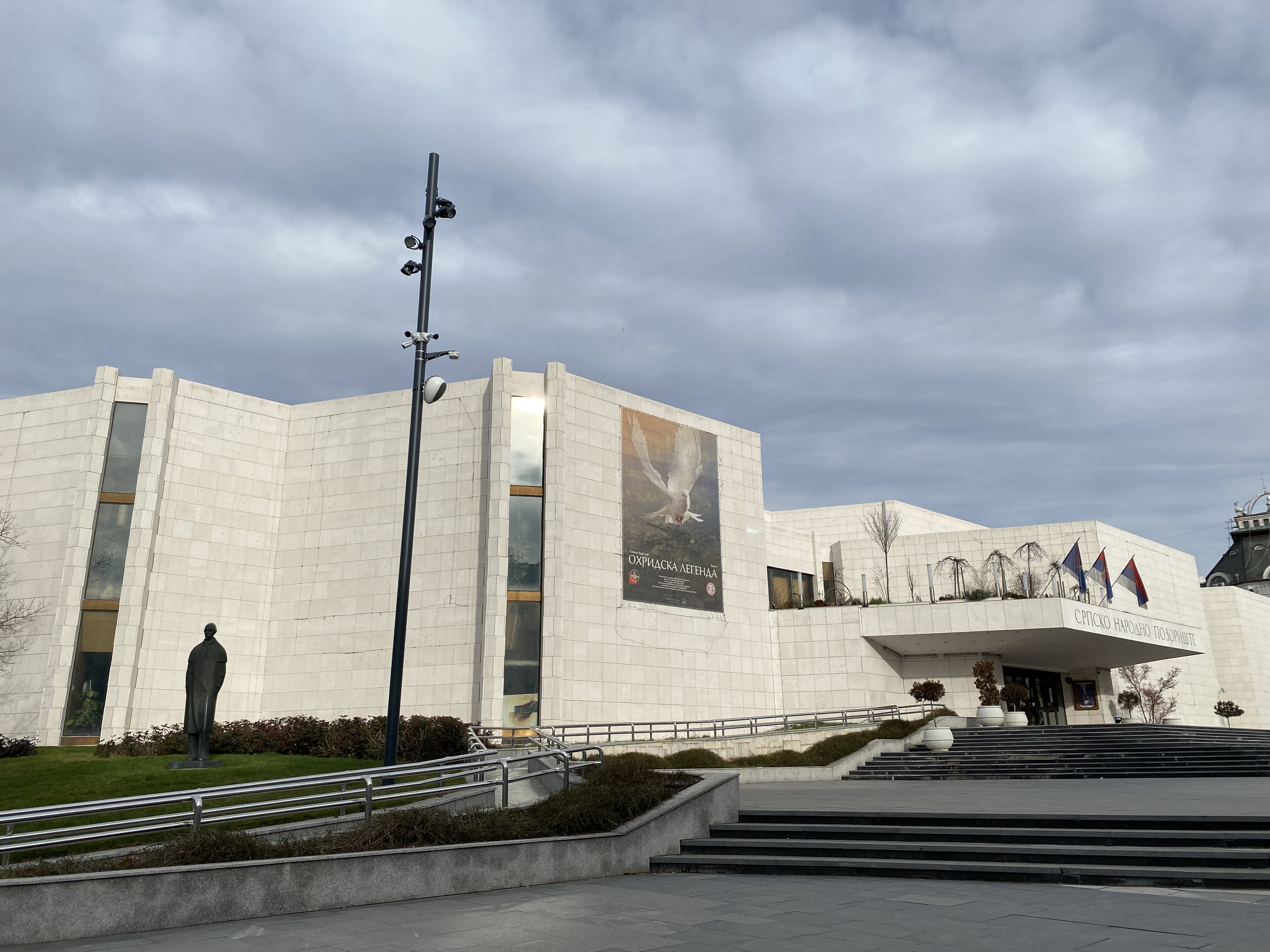
Serbian National Theatre

In the 19th and early 20th century, Novi Sad was the capital of Serbian culture, earning it the nickname Serbian Athens. During that time, many Serbian novelists, poets, jurists, and publishers had lived or worked in Novi Sad at some point in their career, including Vuk Stefanović Karadžić, Mika Antić, Đura Jakšić and Jovan Jovanović Zmaj, among others. Matica srpska, the oldest cultural-scientific institution in Serbia, was moved from Budapest to Novi Sad in 1864, and now contains the second-largest library in the country, the Library of Matica srpska, with over 3.5 million volumes. The Serbian National Theatre, one of the oldest professional theatre among the South Slavs, was founded in Novi Sad in 1861.

Today, Novi Sad is the second largest cultural centre in Serbia, after Belgrade. Municipal officials have made the city more attractive with numerous cultural events and music concerts. Since 2000, Novi Sad is home to the EXIT festival, one of the biggest music summer festivals in Europe. Other important cultural events include the Sterijino pozorje theatre festival, Zmaj Children Games, International Novi Sad Literature Festival, Novi Sad Jazz Festival, and many others. Novi Sad also hosts a fashion show twice a year, attracting local and international designers. Called Serbia Fashion Week, the event also features the works of applied artists, musicians, interior decorators, multimedia experts and architects. In addition to the Serbian National Theatre, other prominent playhouses consist of the Novi Sad Theatre, Novi Sad Youth Theatre, and the Cultural Centre of Novi Sad. The Novi Sad Synagogue also houses many cultural events. Other cultural institutions include the Detachment of the Serbian Academy of Science and Art, Library of Matica Srpska, Novi Sad City Library and Azbukum. The city is also home to the Archives of Vojvodina. dating back to 1565.

Novi Sad has several folk song societies, which are known as kulturno-umetničko društvo or KUD. The best known societies in the city are: KUD Svetozar Marković, AKUD Sonja Marinković, SKUD Željezničar, FA Vila and the oldest SZPD Neven, established in 1892.

Ethnic minorities express their own traditions, folklore and songs through various societies such as the Hungarian MKUD Petőfi Sándor, Slovak SKUD Pavel Jozef Šafárik, and Pannonian Rusyn RKC Novi Sad.

Novi Sad was chosen to be the European Capital of Culture for 2021, however its mandate was moved to 2022 due to the COVID-19 pandemic. From this mandate, the industrial zone in Liman neighborhood was repurposed as an artist quarter known as Distrikt. Due to the continued efforts of local artists, the city became a UNESCO Creative City of Media Arts in 2023.

=== Museums ===
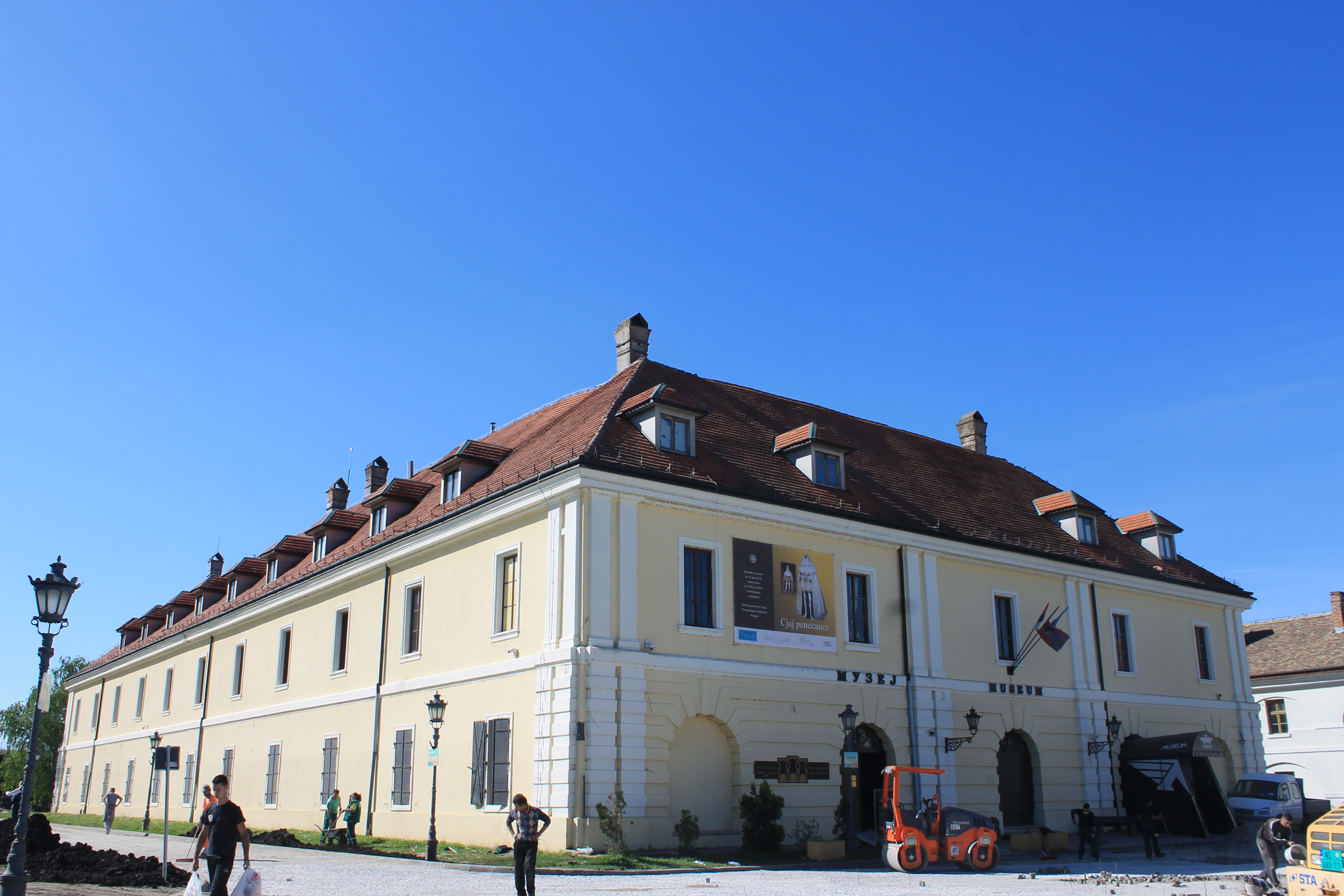
City Museum of Novi Sad

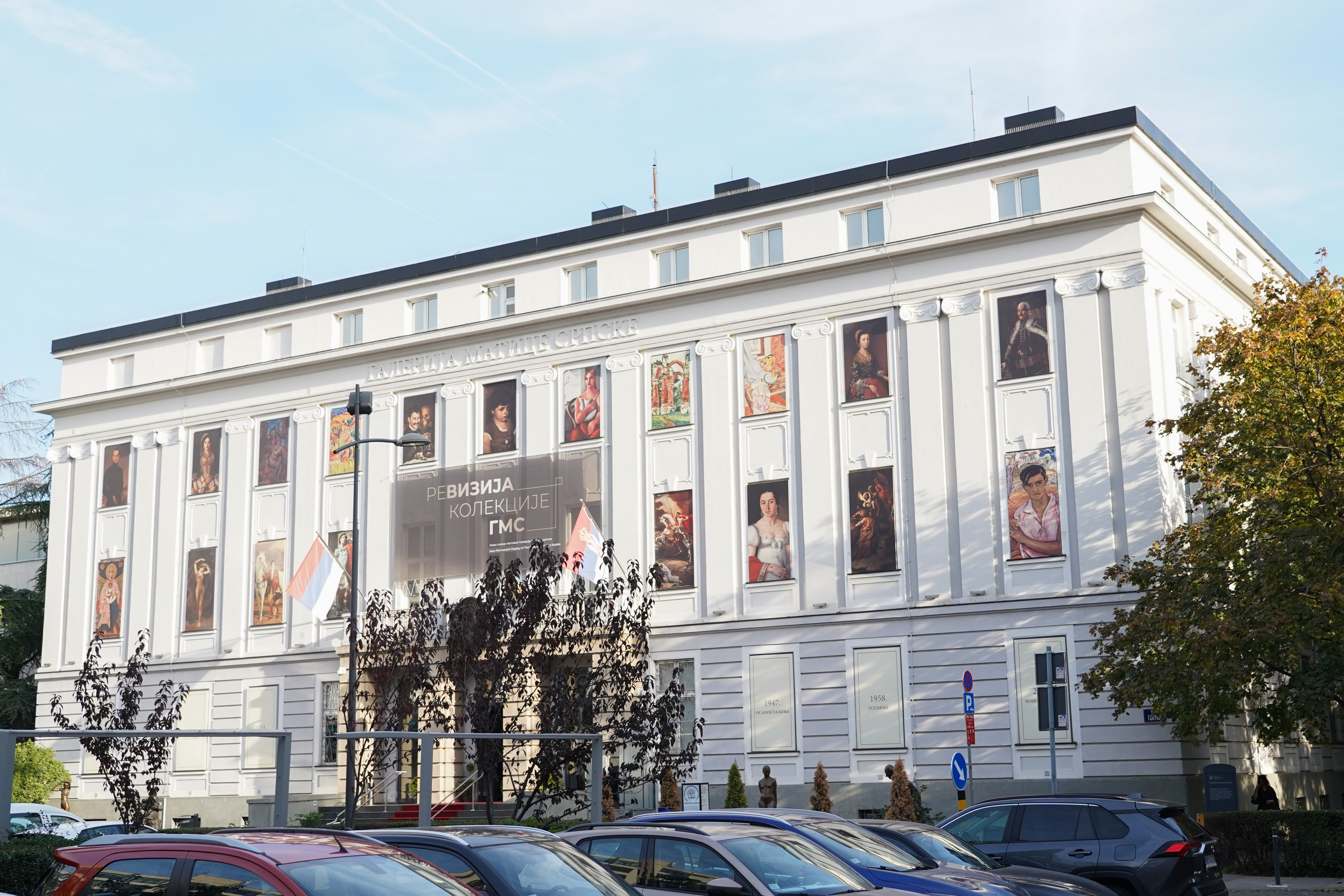
Gallery of Matica Srpska

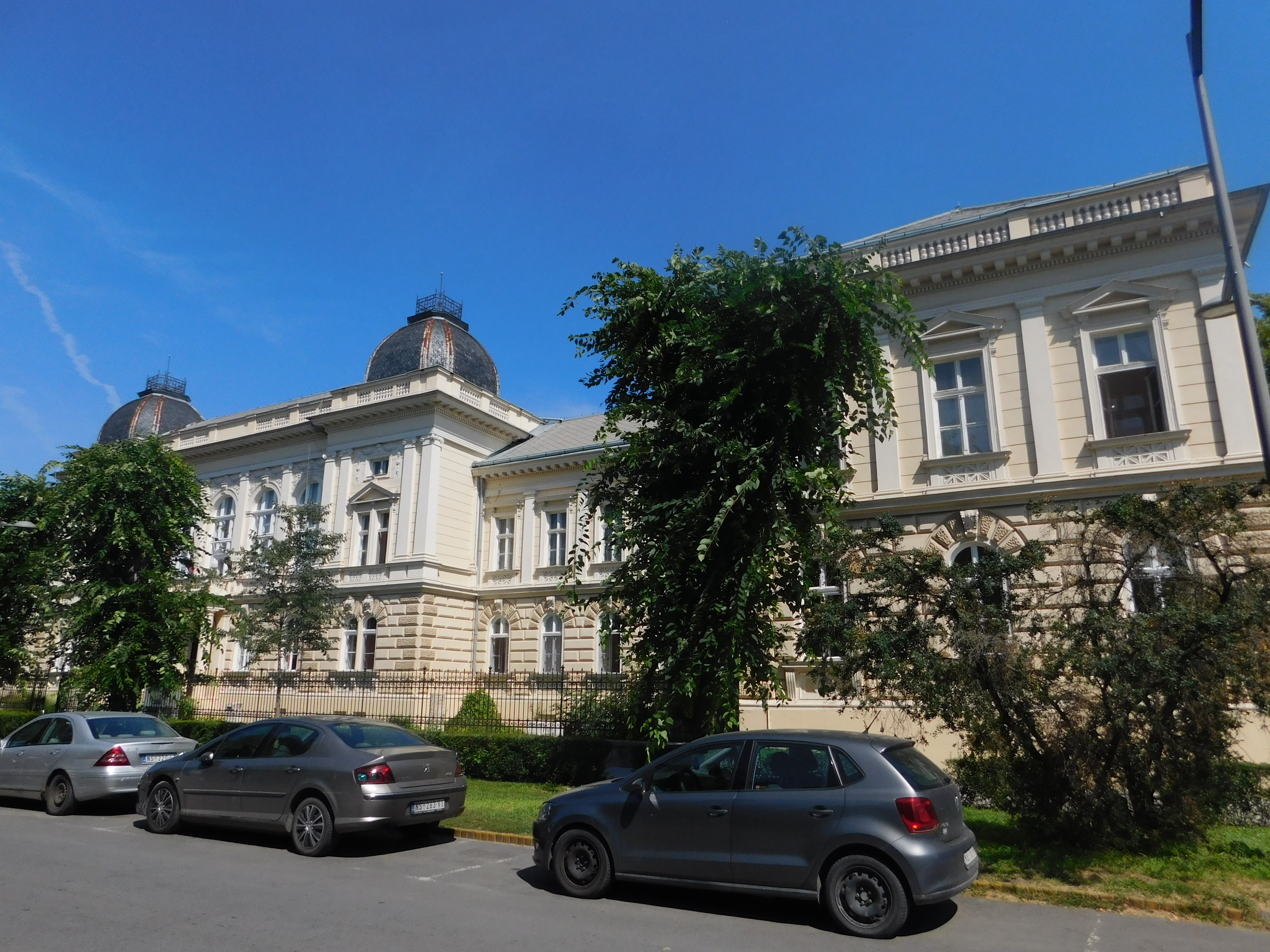
Museum of Vojvodina is an art and natural history museum

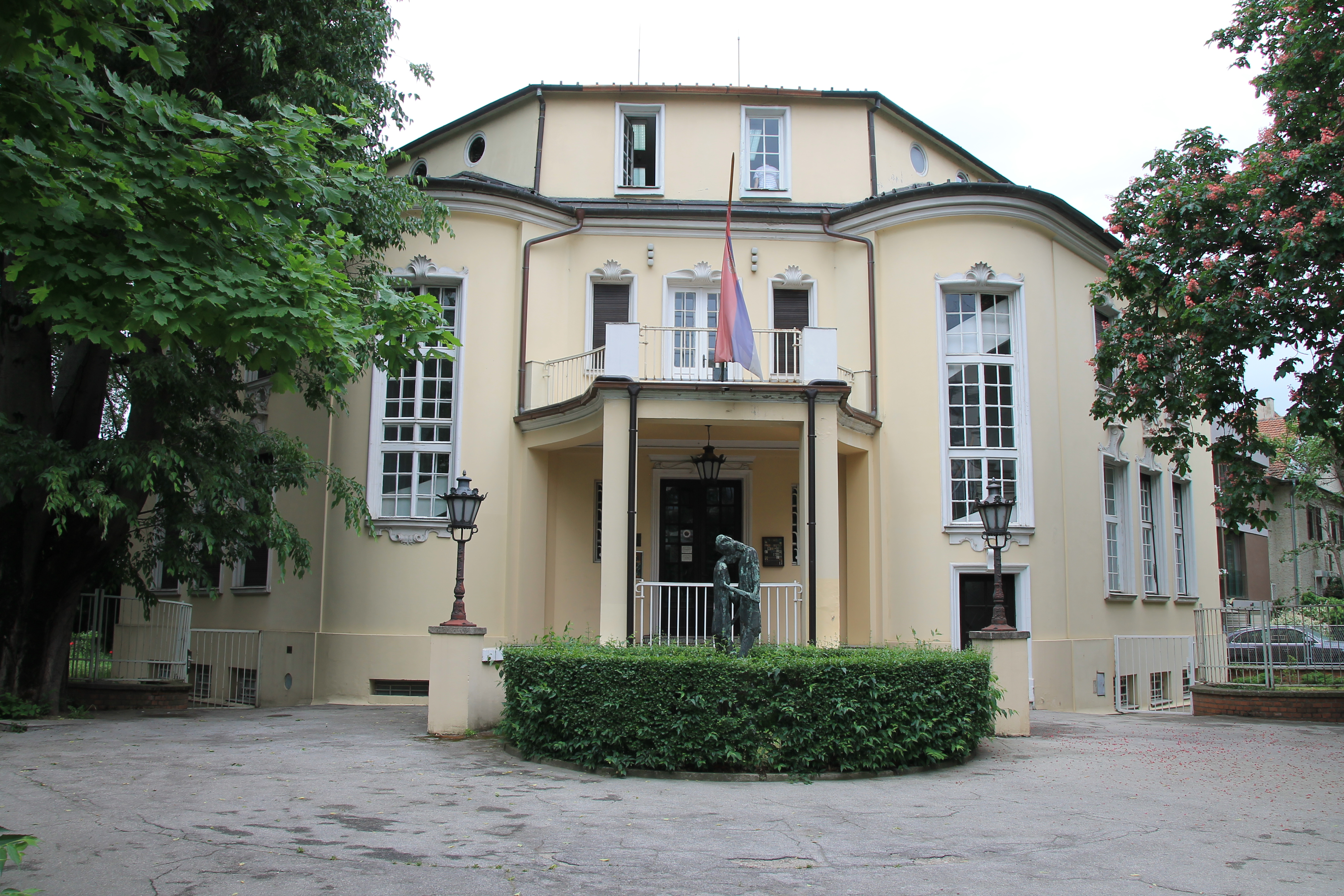
The Gallery of Fine Arts – Gift Collection of Rajko Mamuzić

The city has several museums and galleries, the best known of which is the Museum of Vojvodina, founded in 1847, which houses a permanent collection of Serbian culture and life in Vojvodina since ancient times. The Museum of Novi Sad, located in the Petrovaradin Fortress, has a permanent collection featuring the history of the old fortress and the city.

The Gallery of Matica Srpska, established in 1847, is the largest and most respected exhibition space in the city, with two galleries in the city centre. Other museums include Museum of Contemporary Art of Vojvodina, The Gallery of Fine Arts – Gift Collection of Rajko Mamuzić and The Pavle Beljanski Memorial Collection, featuring one of the most extensive collections of Serbian art from the 1900s until the 1970s.

=== Tourism ===
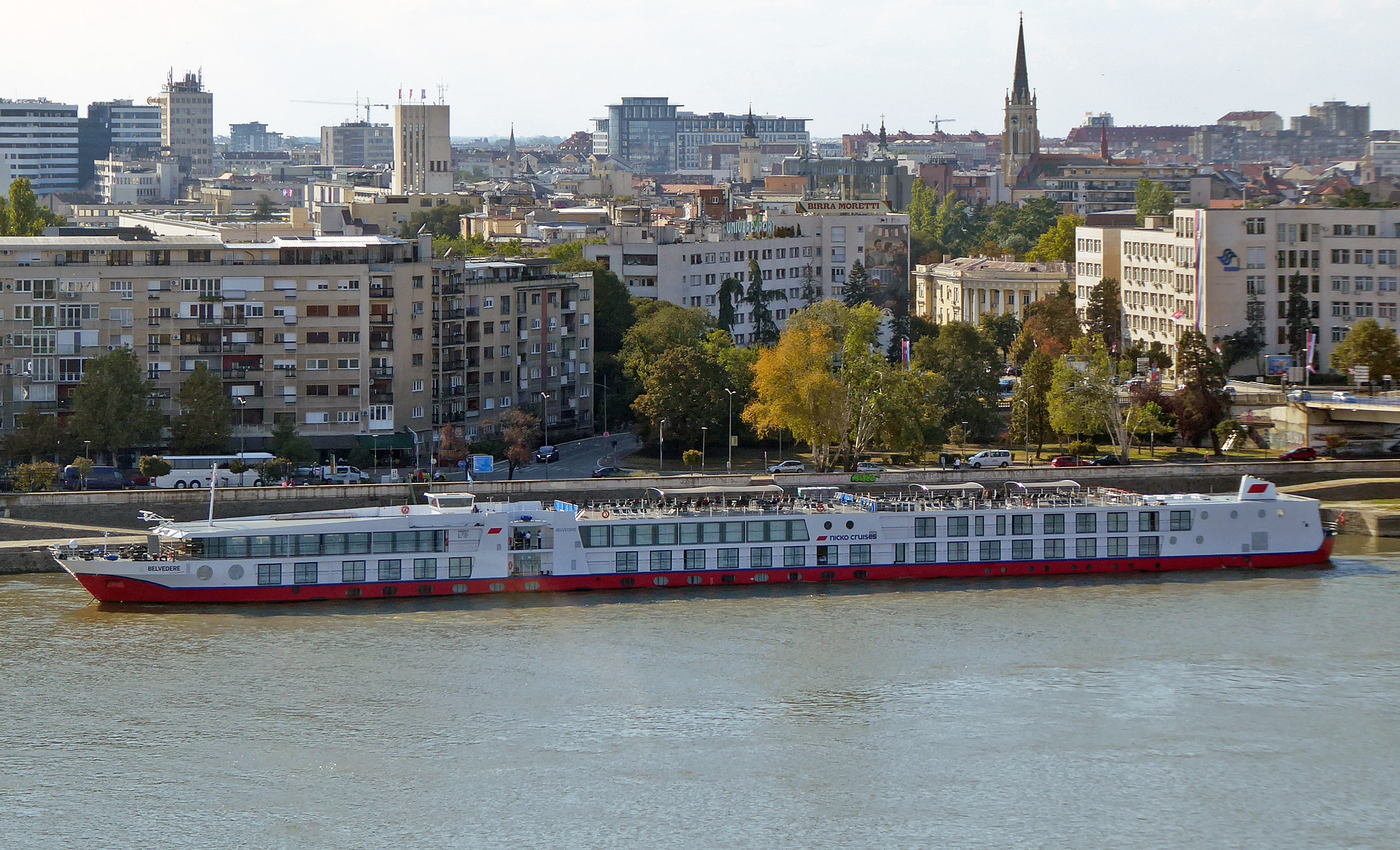
River cruise ship on the Danube

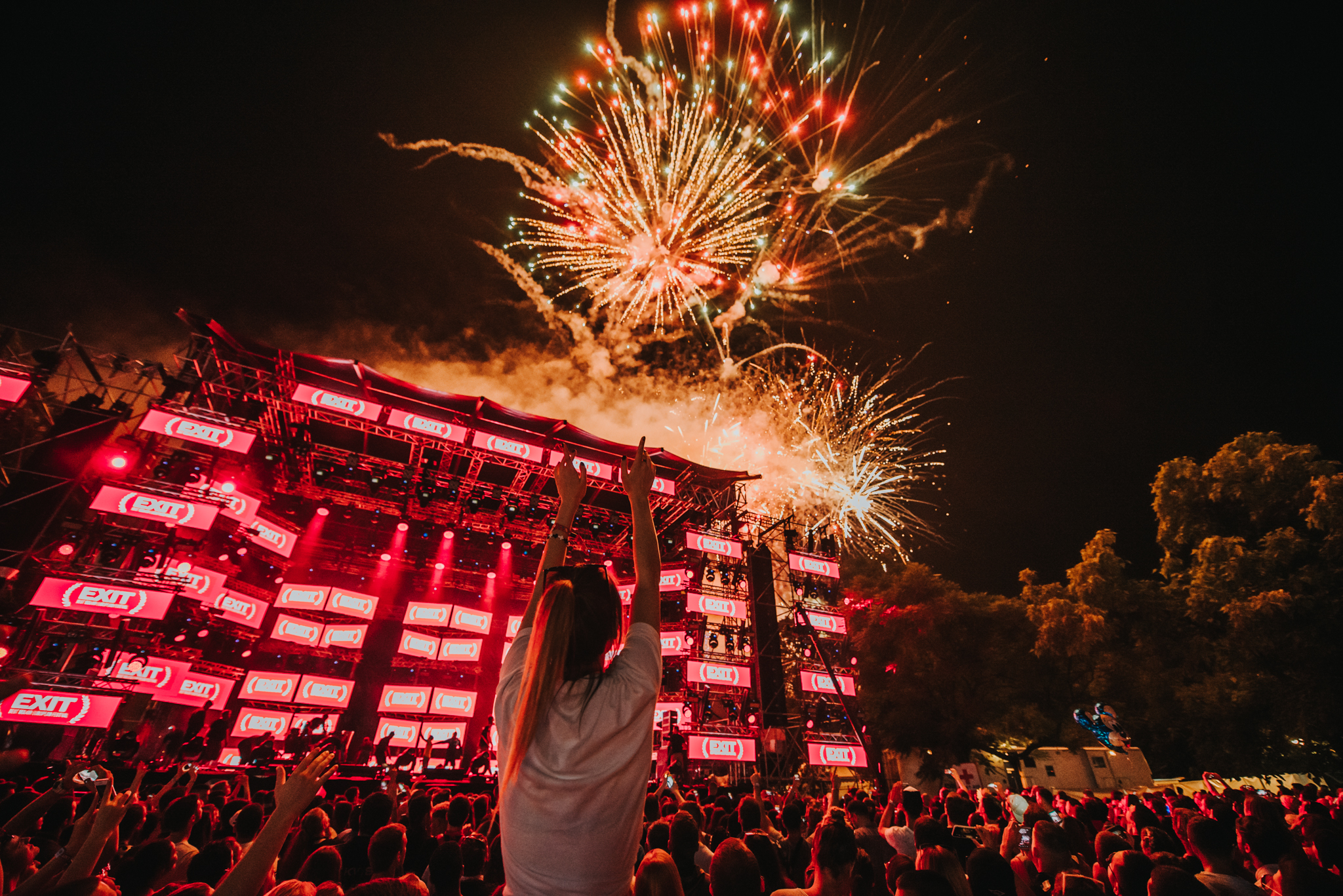
Exit festival

Since the early 2000s, the number of tourists visiting Novi Sad has been steadily rising each year. During the annual EXIT music festival, the city is full of young people from all over Europe. In 2017, over 200,000 visitors from 60 countries came to the festival, attending about 35 concerts.

Other events include shows and congresses organized by Novi Sad Fair, a local management company, bringing in many businesspersons and entrepreneurs to the city. Novi Sad is home to the largest agricultural show in the region, having attracted 600,000 attendees in 2005. The tourist port, near Varadin Bridge in the city centre, welcomes cruise boats from across Europe that travel the Danube.

The most recognized structure in Novi Sad is the Petrovaradin Fortress, which dominates the skyline and also offers scenic views of the city. The nearby historic neighbourhood of Stari Grad has many monuments, museums, cafes, restaurants and shops. Also in the vicinity, is the Fruška Gora National Park, approximately 20 km (12 mi) from the city centre.

A total of 234,708 tourist arrivals with 567,926 overnight stays were recorded in 2023.

=== Cuisine ===
Typical Serbian food can be found in Novi Sad, including traditional dishes like ćevapi, burek, kajmak, kiseli kupus, kiflice and pasulj, as well as fish dishes, local cheeses and charcuterie. Restaurants and farmsteads offer fresh produce from local farmers and also regional vintages from Fruska Gora's wineries. Modern alternatives are available at some of the city's top restaurants, which prepare traditional fare with an updated twist. Pastry shops serve local specialties such as layered cakes made from ground nuts and cream, referred to as 'torta' in Serbian. Desserts also often include raspberries, one of the region's largest exports, and historic Dunavska Street is home to many ice cream parlors.

Index sandwich, named after university student index books, is a popular local street food since the 1980s. It is made out of a bread roll stuffed with melted cheese, ham, mushrooms and lashings of sauce.

=== Green areas and recreation ===
The parks and green areas of Novi Sad form an important part of the city's urban and natural landscape, encompassing landscaped city parks, promenades, and protected natural areas. Among the most notable urban parks are Danube Park, Futoški Park, the Liman parks, and Kamenički Park, which play a significant recreational, ecological, and cultural role within the city.

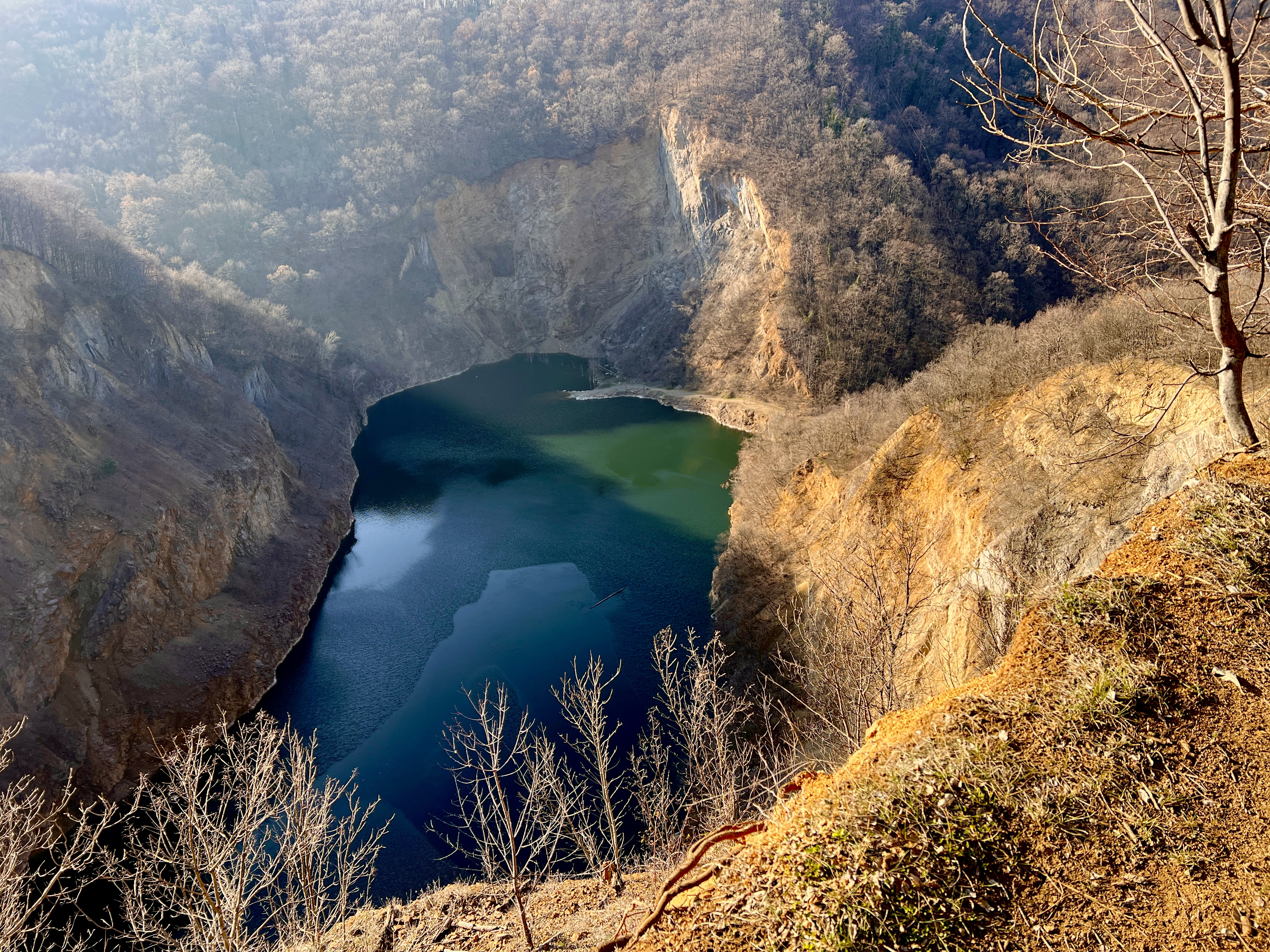
Fruška Gora National Park, the oldest national park in Serbia, represents the primary recreational and outdoor sports area for the residents of Novi Sad. In the image: the Lake Ledinci area.

A distinct group of green spaces is located in the Petrovaradin area, including the parks and landscaped zones surrounding the Petrovaradin Fortress. These areas function as promenades and viewpoints overlooking the Danube and the city. Adjacent to the fortress is Molinarijev Park, a smaller green space closely connected to the historical setting of the fortification.

The wider area of Novi Sad also includes several valuable natural sites outside the urban core. The Fruška Gora National Park, located south of the city, represents a major natural and recreational area known for its forest ecosystems, vineyards, protected plant and animal species, and cultural and historical heritage. To the north and east of the city lies the Koviljsko-Petrovaradinski Rit Special Nature Reserve, a wetland area along the Danube that is of exceptional importance for biodiversity conservation, characterized by rich flora and fauna, particularly wetland bird species, fish, and floodplain habitats. Together, the city parks, Petrovaradin green areas, Fruška Gora, and the Koviljsko-Petrovaradinski Rit form the distinctive green belt of Novi Sad.

The inhabitants of Novi Sad engage in a wide range of recreational and leisure activities. With regards to team sports, football and basketball have the highest numbers of participants. Cycling is also popular due to the city's flat terrain and the extensive off-road network, found in nearby mountainous Fruška Gora. Hundreds of commuters cycle the roads, bike lanes and bike paths daily.

Proximity to the Fruška Gora National Park attracts many city dwellers on the weekends. They enjoy the numerous hiking trails, restaurants and monasteries located in and around the mountain area. Occurring on the first weekend of every May, the Fruška Gora Marathon lets hikers, runners and cyclists take advantage of the many hiking trails. During the summer months, citizens from Novi Sad visit Lake Ledinci in Fruška Gora, as well as the numerous beaches situated along the Danube, the largest being Štrand in the Liman neighbourhood. There are also several recreational marinas bordering the river.

== Economy ==
Novi Sad is the economic centre of Vojvodina, the most fertile agricultural region in Serbia. The city also represents one of the largest economic and cultural hubs in Serbia.

Novi Sad had always been a developed city within the former Yugoslavia. In 1981, its GDP per capita was 172% of the Yugoslav average. During the 1990s, the city, like the rest of Serbia, was severely affected by an internationally imposed trade embargo and hyperinflation of the Yugoslav dinar. The embargo, along with economic mismanagement, led to a decay or demise of once important industrial combines, such as Novkabel (electric cable industry), Pobeda (metal industry), Jugoalat (tools), Albus and HINS (chemical industry). Practically the only viable large facilities remaining today are the oil refinery, located northeast of the city, and the thermal power plant TE-TO Novi Sad.

The economy of Novi Sad has mostly recovered from that period and grown strongly since 2001, shifting from an industry-driven economy to the tertiary sector. The processes involved in privatizing state and society-owned enterprises, as well as strong private incentives, have increased the share of privately owned companies to over 95% in the district, with small and medium-size enterprises dominating the city's economic development.

The significance of Novi Sad as a financial centre is already proven, by being home to the national headquarters of numerous banks, such as Erste Bank, Vojvođanska banka, and Crédit Agricole; as well as the third largest insurance company in Serbia, DDOR Novi Sad. Furthermore, the city is home to major energy companies like Naftna Industrija Srbije oil company and Srbijagas gas company. It is also the seat of many farms for wheat production and trade.

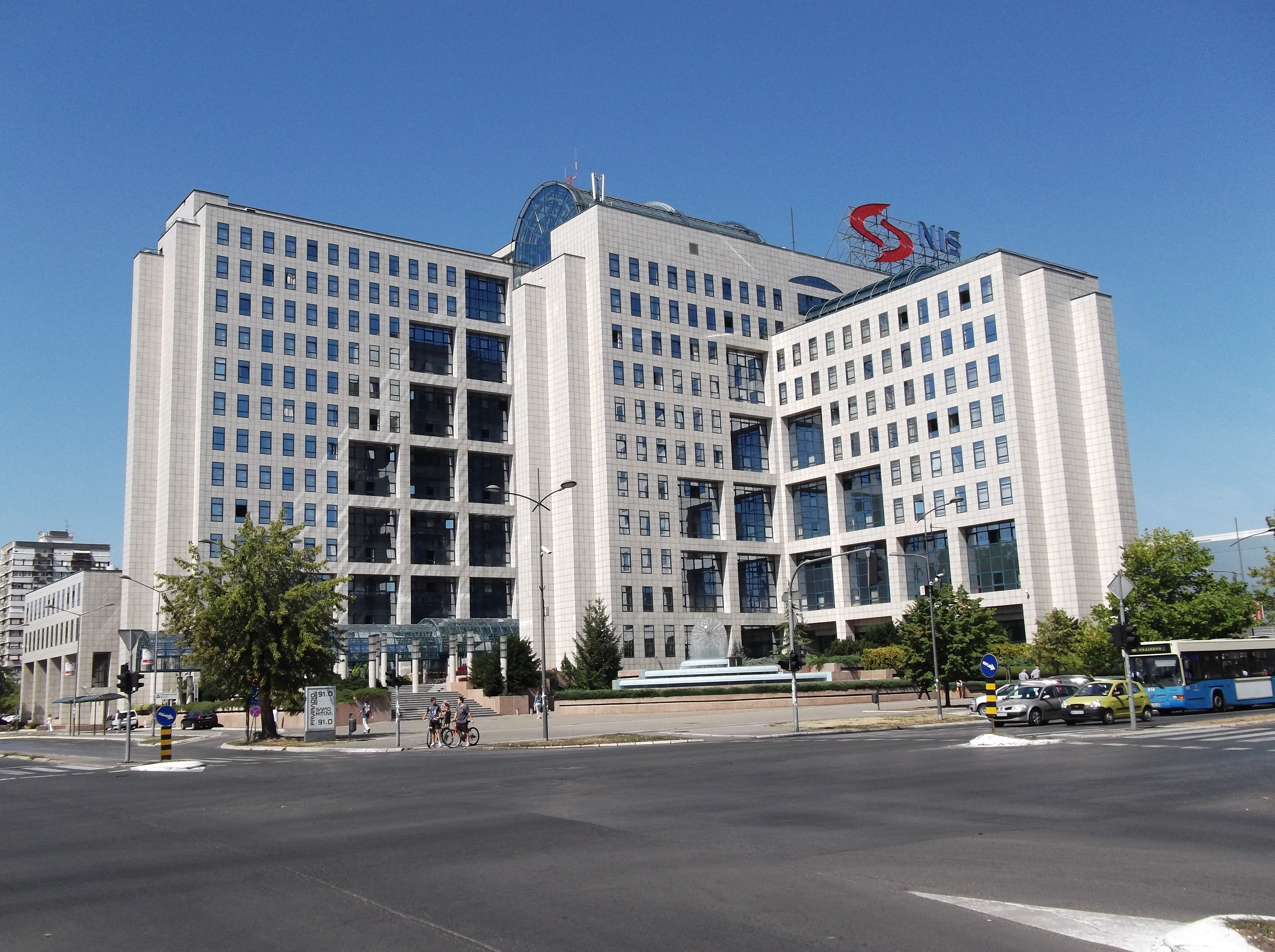
Petroleum Industry of Serbia headquarters

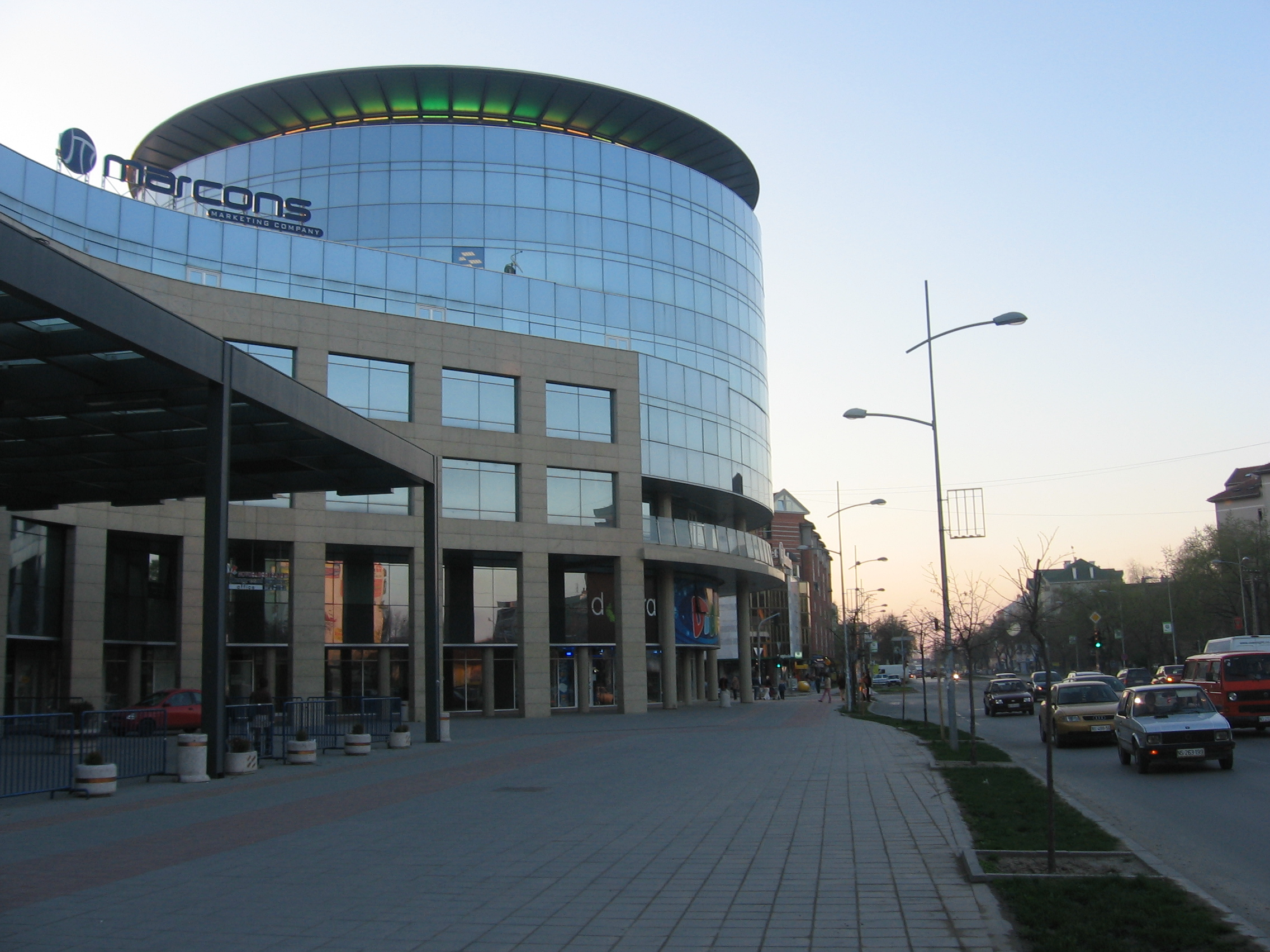
Novi Sad Fair Convention Center

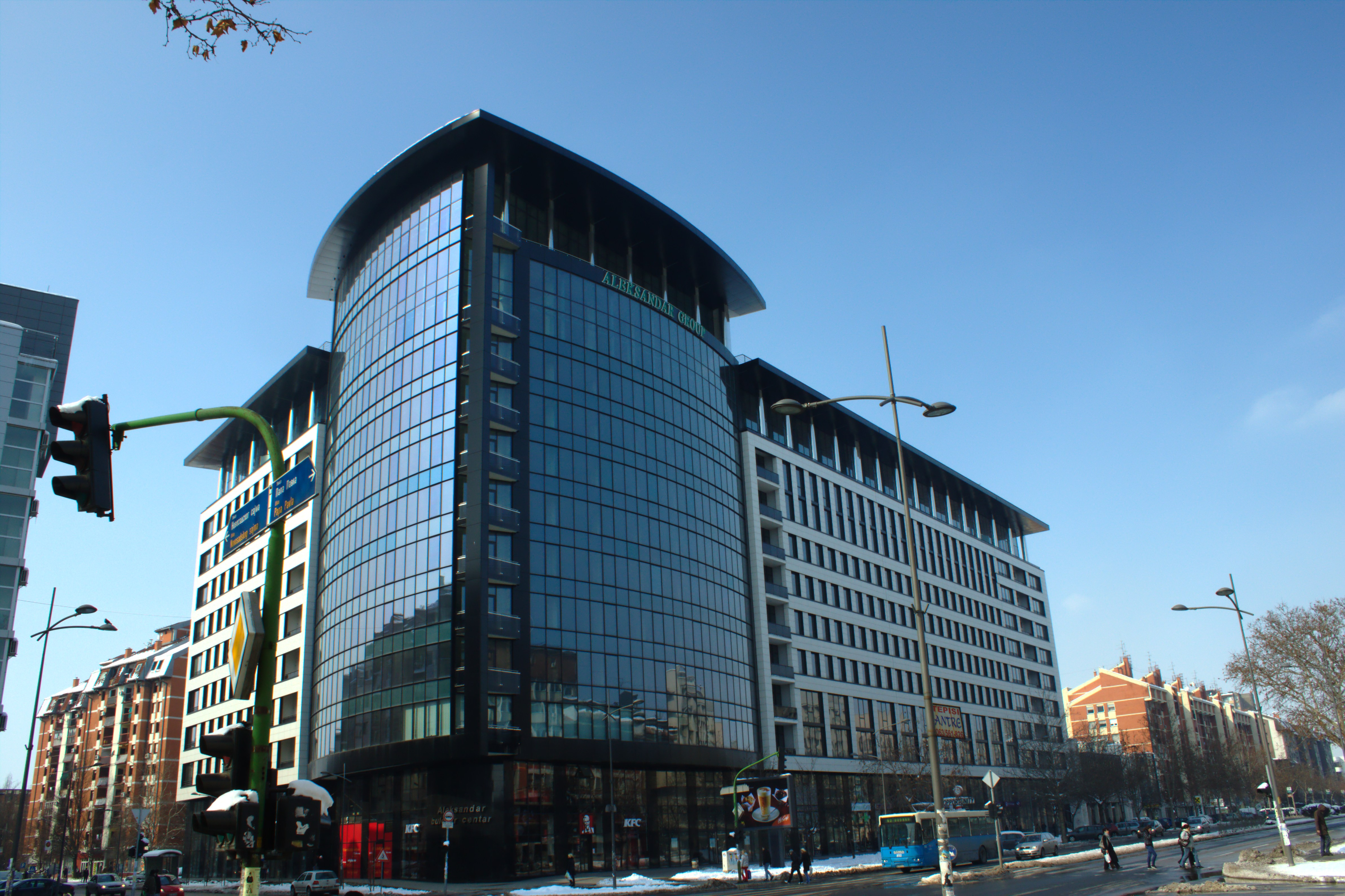
Aleksandar Bulevar Centar

Novi Sad is also a growing information technology centre within Serbia, second only to Belgrade. As many as 900 IT companies operate in Novi Sad out of a total of 2,500 registered in the territory of the Republic of Serbia with over 11,500 employees. As of September 2017, Novi Sad has one of 14 free economic zones established in Serbia.

The following table gives a preview of total number of registered people employed in legal entities per their core activity (as of 2022):

Activity	Total
Agriculture, forestry and fishing	1,633
Mining and quarrying	749
Manufacturing	25,675
Electricity, gas, steam and air conditioning supply	1,474
Water supply; sewerage, waste management and remediation activities	1,769
Construction	10,624
Wholesale and retail trade, repair of motor vehicles and motorcycles	28,527
Transportation and storage	8,904
Accommodation and food services	7,229
Information and communication	13,086
Financial and insurance activities	4,717
Real estate activities	845
Professional, scientific and technical activities	13,115
Administrative and support service activities	6,902
Public administration and defense; compulsory social security	8,080
Education	14,068
Human health and social work activities	12,752
Arts, entertainment and recreation	3,928
Other service activities	3,899
Individual agricultural workers	578
Total	168,556

== Politics ==
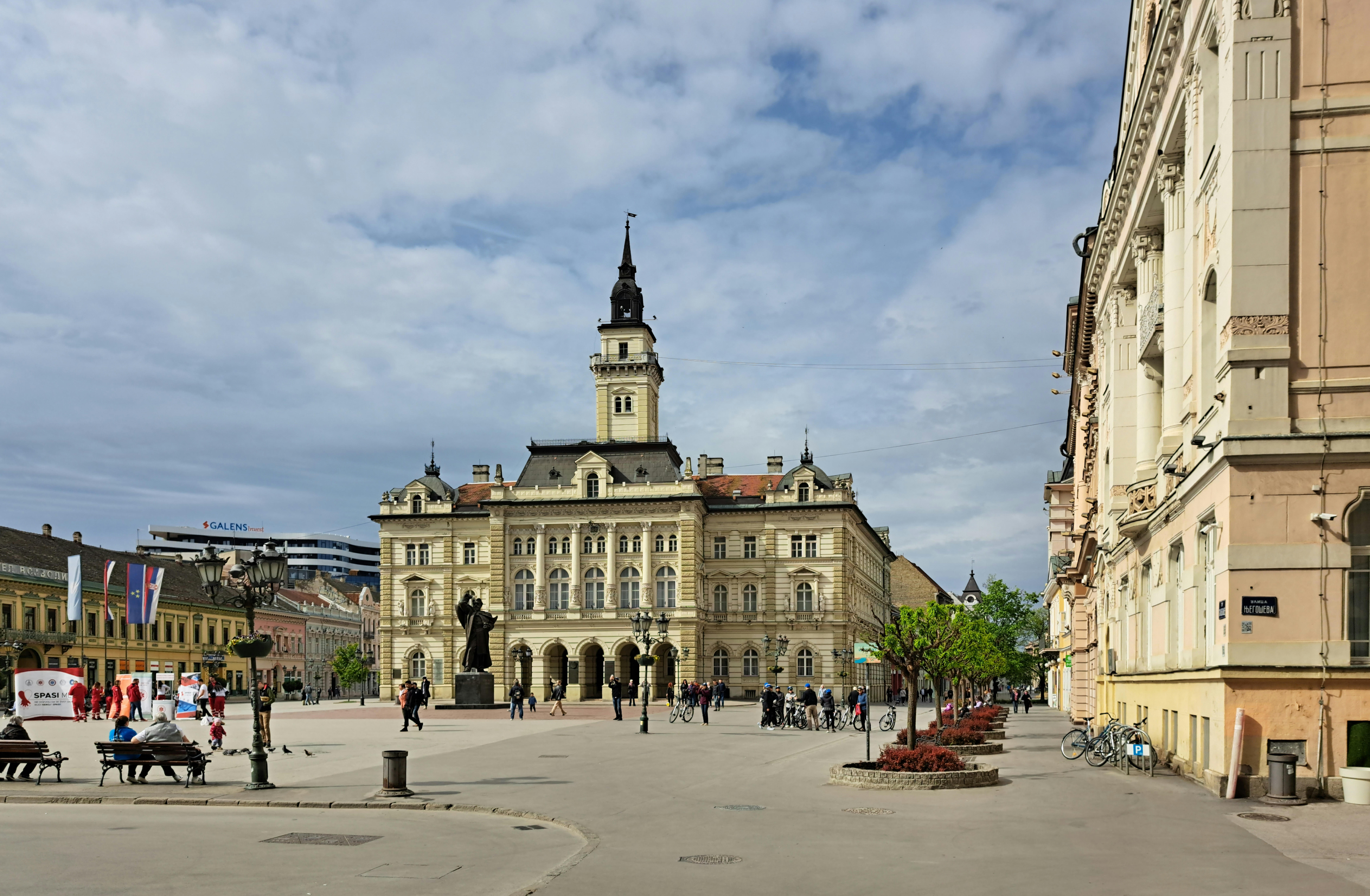
Novi Sad City Hall, seat of the mayor and city government

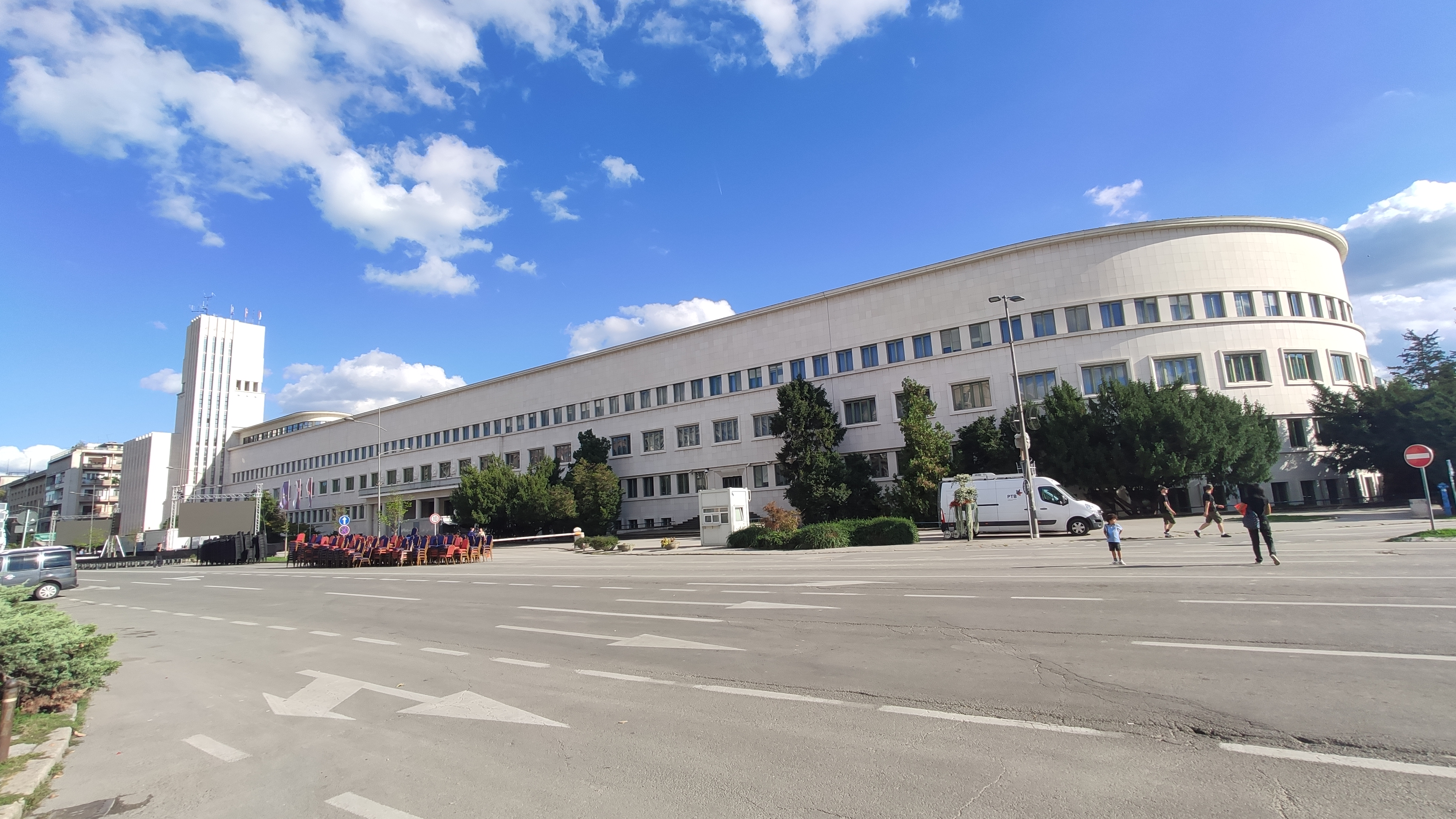
Banovina Palace, seat of the provincial assembly and government

Novi Sad is the administrative centre of the Autonomous Province of Vojvodina, and as such, home to Vojvodina's Government and Provincial Assembly.

The city's administrative bodies include the city assembly as the representative body, as well as the mayor and city government defining the executive bodies. The mayor and city assembly members are chosen through direct elections. The city assembly has 78 seats, while the city government consists of 11 members. The mayor and members of the city's assembly are elected to four-year terms. The city government is elected by the city assembly at the proposal of the mayor.

As of 2025, the mayor of Novi Sad is Žarko Mićin of the Serbian Progressive Party. While his party holds the majority of seats in the city assembly, the Socialist Party of Serbia, the Democratic Party of Serbia, as well as other parties and groups, are also represented.

The city of Novi Sad is divided into 47 local communities.

City holidays

1 February	On this day, in 1748, Novi Sad gained 'free royal city' status.
23 October	The partisan forces from Srem and Bačka entered and liberated the city from occupation on this day, in 1944.
9 November	Troops of the Kingdom of Serbia entered the city on this day, in 1918, led by commandant Petar Bojović.
25 November	In 1918, the Assembly of Serbs, Bunjevci, and other Slavs of Vojvodina (Banat, Bačka and Baranja) in Novi Sad proclaimed the unification of Vojvodina region with the Kingdom of Serbia.

The city commemorates the year 1694, when it was established.

Coat of arms

The design consists of three white towers placed in the centre, set against a blue sky. A white dove holding an olive branch flies above the larger middle tower. All three structures have rooftops with crenellations, as well as opened windows and closed gates. Below the towers lies a green background, with a wavy white line depicting the river Danube.

== Society ==
=== Education ===
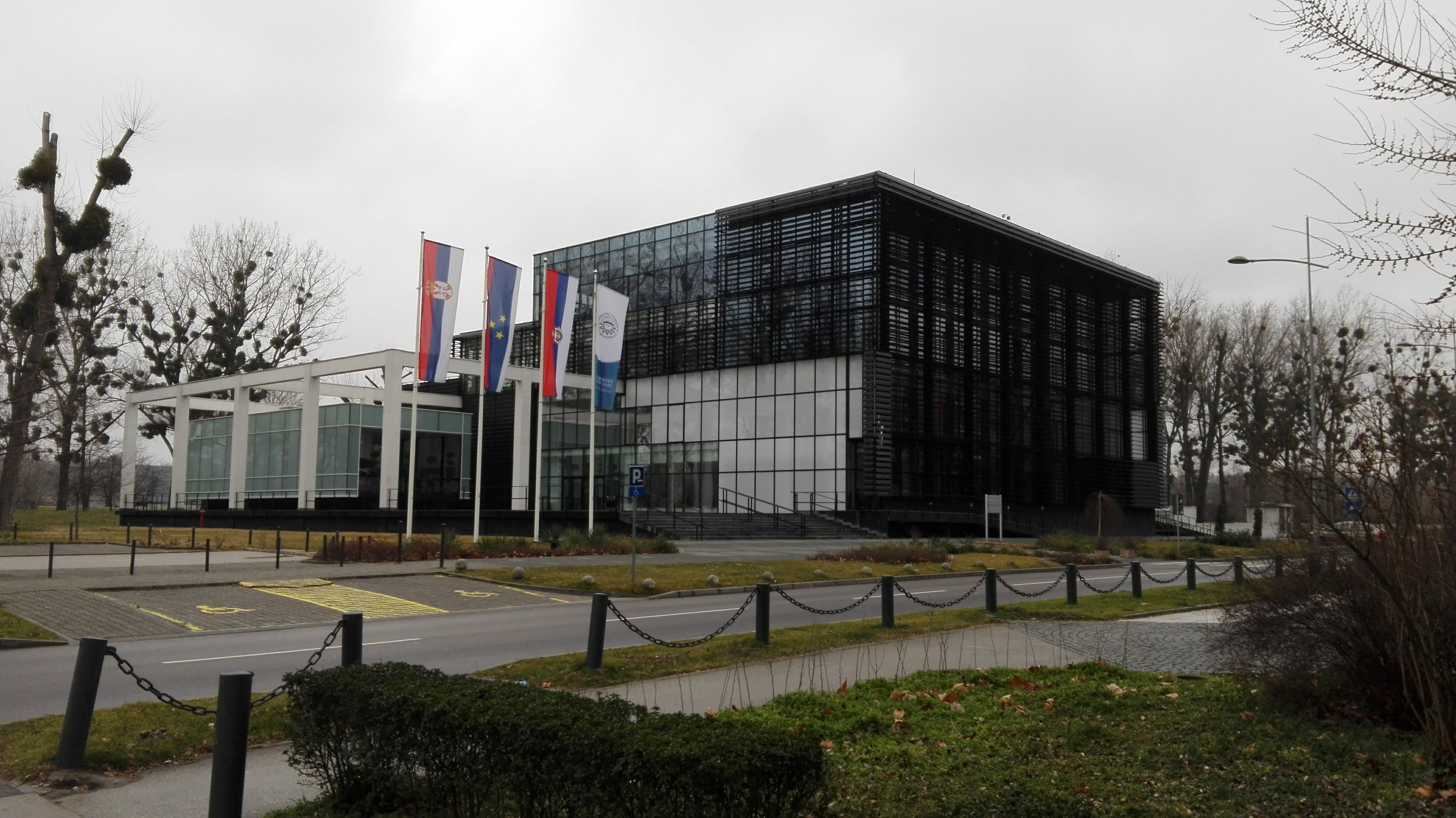
Rectorate of the University of Novi Sad

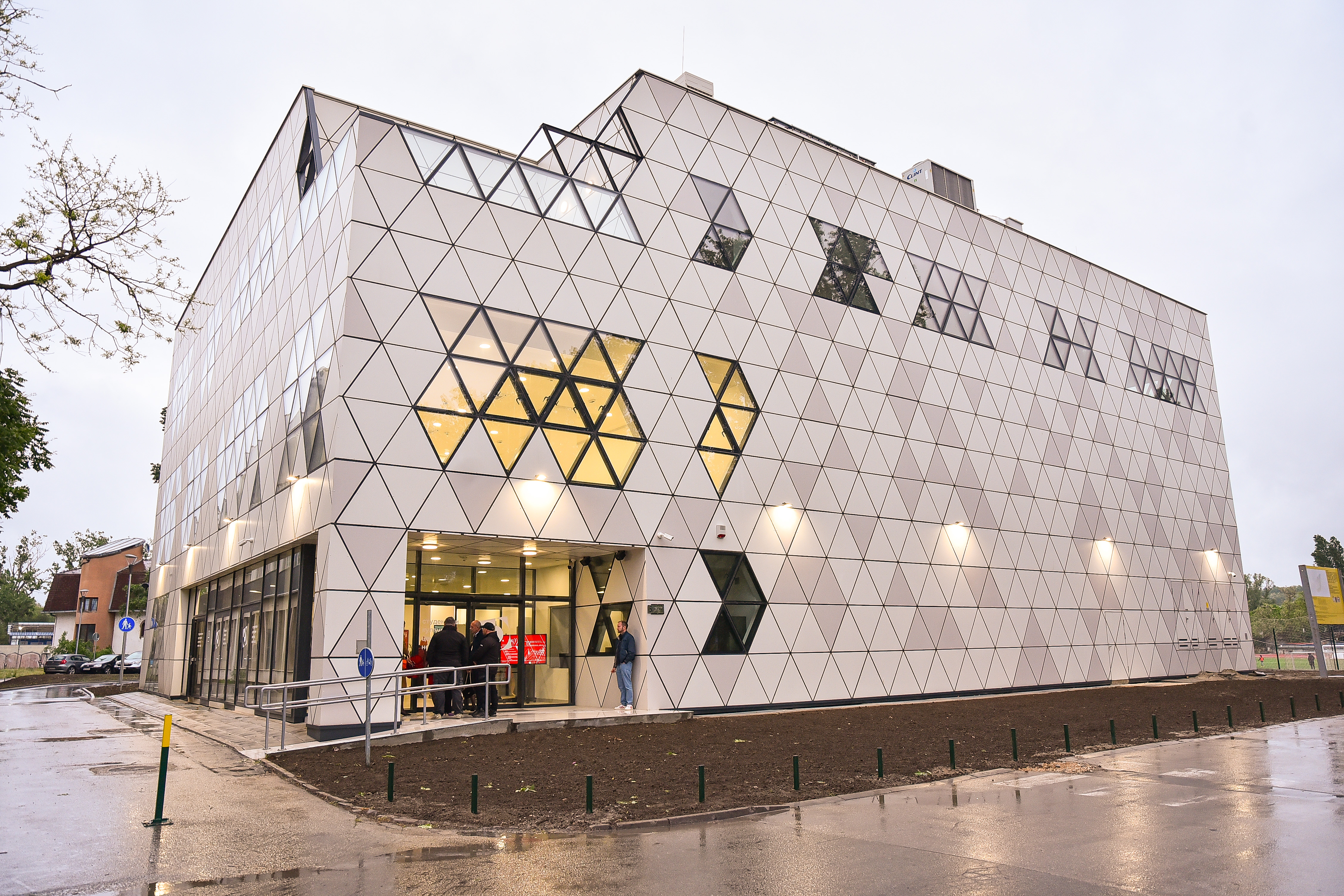
Student Cultural Center of the University of Novi Sad

Novi Sad is one of the most important centres of higher education and research in Serbia, with four universities overall and numerous professional, technical, and private colleges and research institutes, including a law school with its own publication. The largest educational institution in the city is the University of Novi Sad, a public school established in 1960. As of 2012, it has 14 faculties, 9 of which are located on the main university campus. It is attended by more than 50,000 students and has a total staff of nearly 5,000.

Business Academy University and EducoNS University are private schools also located in the city. Other educational institutions include Novi Sad Open University, offering professional courses in adult education, and the Protestant Theological Seminary.

As of 2022, there are 37 elementary schools (33 public and 4 private) with about 26,000 students. The secondary school system consists of 25 vocational schools (12 public and 13 private) and 4 gymnasiums with almost 18,000 students.

=== Media ===
Novi Sad has one major daily newspaper, Dnevnik, and among the periodicals, the monthly magazine Vojvođanski magazin stands out. The city is also home to the regional public broadcaster, Radio Television of Vojvodina (RTV), and municipal public broadcaster, Novosadska televizija, as well as a few commercial TV stations such as Kanal 9, Panonija and RTV Most. Major local commercial radio stations include Radio AS FM and Radio 021.

Novi Sad is also known as a publishing centre. The most important publishing houses are Matica srpska, Stilos, and Prometej. Well-known journals, in literature and art, include Letopis Matice srpske, the oldest Serbian journal, Polja, which is issued by the Cultural Center of Novi Sad, and Zlatna greda, published by the Association of Writers of Vojvodina.

The city hosts an annual literature conference, Book Talk.

=== Sports ===
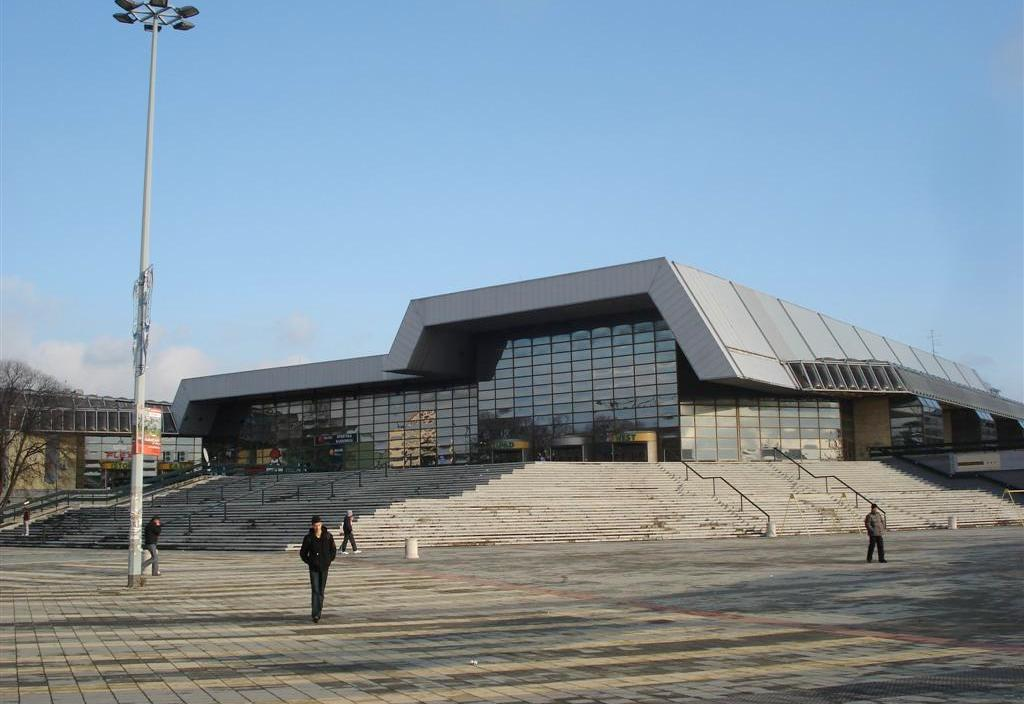
SPENS Sports Center

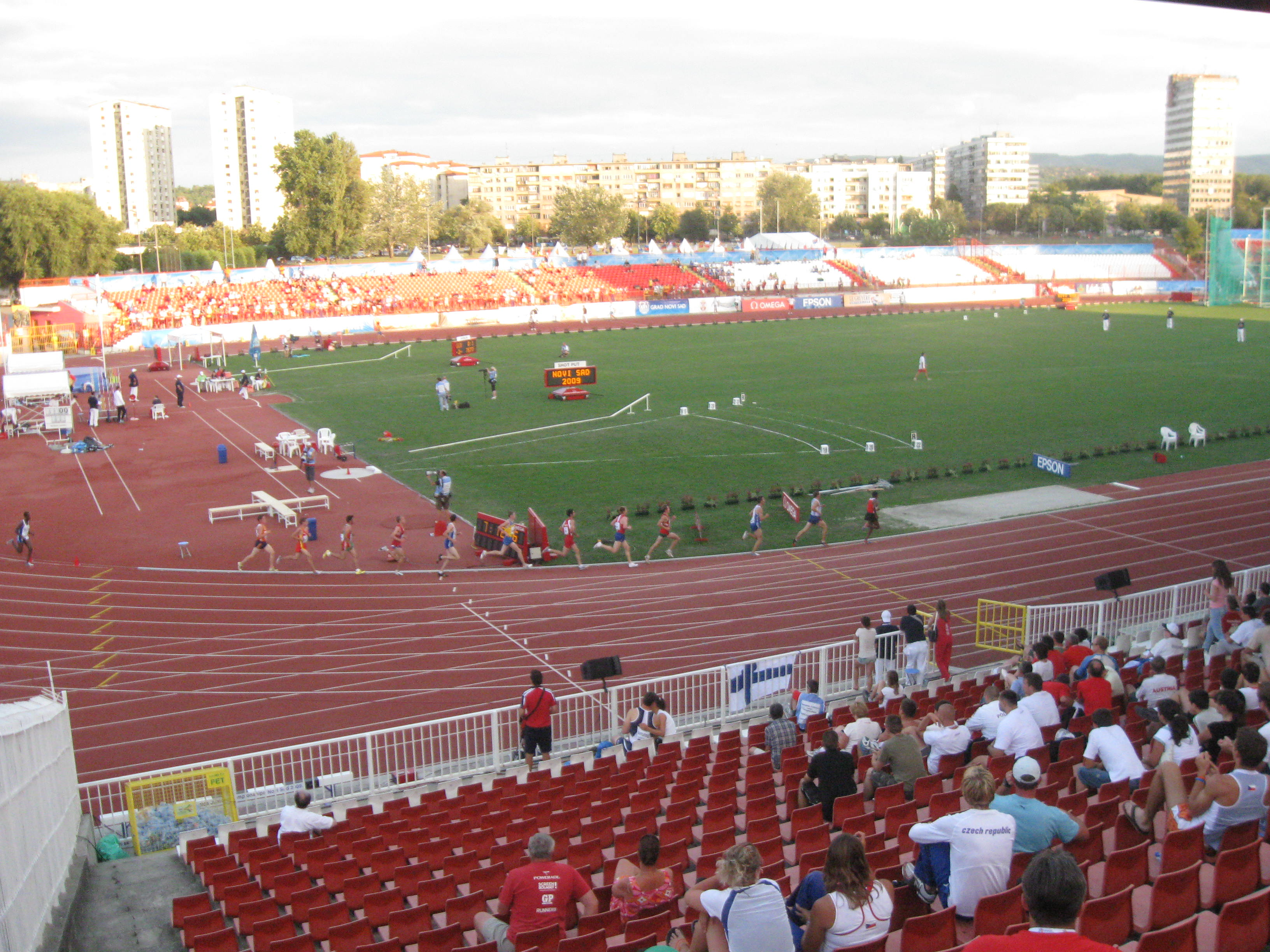
Karađorđe Stadium

Founded in 1790, the 'City Marksmen Association' became the first sporting organization in Novi Sad. Founded on 28 March 1885, VK Danubius 1885 is the oldest rowing club in former Yugoslavia. A more widespread interest in competitive sports developed after the Municipal Association of Physical Culture was created in 1959 and when the SPENS Sports Center was built in 1981. Nowadays, about 220 sports organizations are active in Novi Sad.

Professional sports in Novi Sad mostly revolve around the Vojvodina multi-sport club. Having won two championships in 1966 and 1989, the FK Vojvodina football club represents the 3rd all-time best team in Serbia, right behind its two Belgrade rivals, Red Star and Partizan. With 13 championship titles, OK Vojvodina is the top volleyball team in the country. As for handball, RK Vojvodina has won the national championship on multiple occasions.

Athletes from Novi Sad had the honour of participating in the first Olympic Games in Athens. The largest number of Novi Sad competitors, to participate in the Olympics, was at the Atlanta Games. Eleven athletes won 6 medals there. Three also competed at the 1980 Moscow Games, while two participated in the 1976 Montreal Games and the 1956 Melbourne Games.

Many national and international competitions are held in the city. Novi Sad played host to the European and World Championships in table tennis in 1981 and the 29th Chess Olympiad in 1990. It also welcomed the European and World Championships in sambo, the Balkan and European Championships in judo, the 1987 final match of the Saporta Cup in European basketball, and the final tournament of the European volleyball cup. Furthermore, Novi Sad co-hosted the 2005 European Basketball Championship, as well as hosting the 2017 Volleyball World League matches. The year 2018 saw the city welcome the Senior European Fencing Championships and the European Senior Karate Championships.

The city also holds traditional sporting events such as the Novi Sad marathon, international swimming competitions and many other events. The very first 'MTB Petrovaradin Fortress Cup' took place in 2018, allowing national and regional cyclists to compete. It is also the first mountain bike competition to be held in Serbia.

Club	Sport	Founded	League	Venue
VK Danubius	Rowing	1885		
FK Vojvodina	Football	1914	Serbian Superliga	Karađorđe Stadium
RFK Novi Sad	Football	1921	Serbian League	Detelinara Stadium
FK Slavija Novi Sad	Football	1926		Salajka Stadium
FK Kabel	Football	1932	Serbian League Vojvodina	FK Kabel Stadium
VK Vojvodina	Water polo	1938	Serbian League, Regional League A2	Slana Bara Sports Center
OK Vojvodina	Volleyball	1946	Serbian volley league	SPENS Sports Center
KKK Vojvodina	Kayak and Canoe	1947		
KK Vojvodina	Basketball	1948	League B	SPENS Sports Center
RK Vojvodina	Handball	1949	Handball League of Serbia	Slana Bara Sports Center
FK Proleter	Football	1951	Dissolved in 2022, merger with RFK Novi Sad	Slana Bara Stadium
HK Vojvodina	Ice hockey	1957	Serbian Hockey League	SPENS Sports Center
FK Mladost	Football	1972	Serbian First League	GAT Arena
ŽFK Fruškogorac	Women's football	1998	Druga Liga Srbije Sever	GAT Arena

== Transportation ==
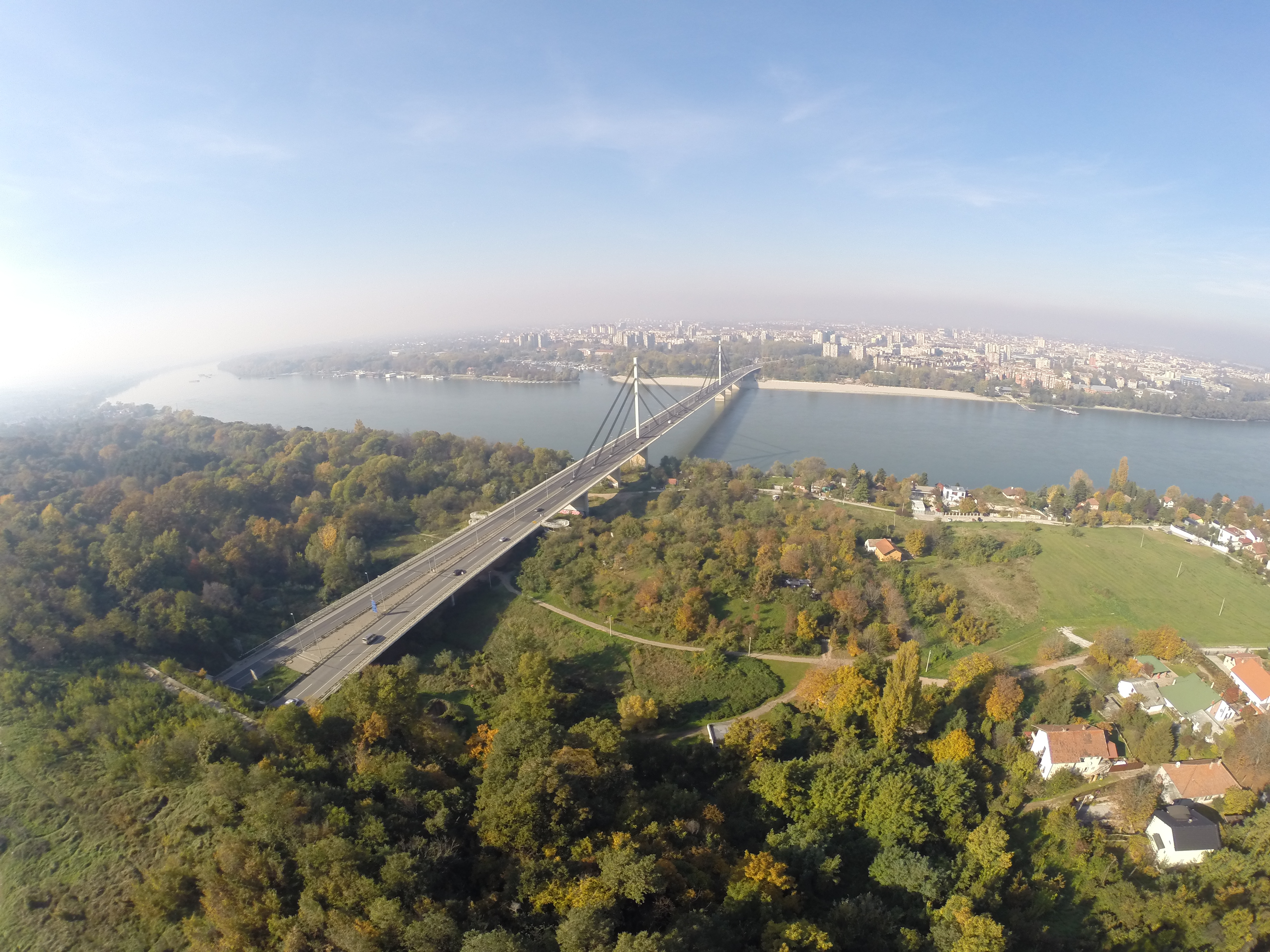
Liberty Bridge

Air transport

Novi Sad currently does not have its own civil airport. The city is roughly a one-hour drive from Belgrade Nikola Tesla Airport, which connects it with capitals across Europe. The small Čenej Airfield to the north of the city is used for sporting and agricultural purposes. There are plans to upgrade it to serve for cargo and small-scale public transport, but the future of this initiative is uncertain.

Urban transport

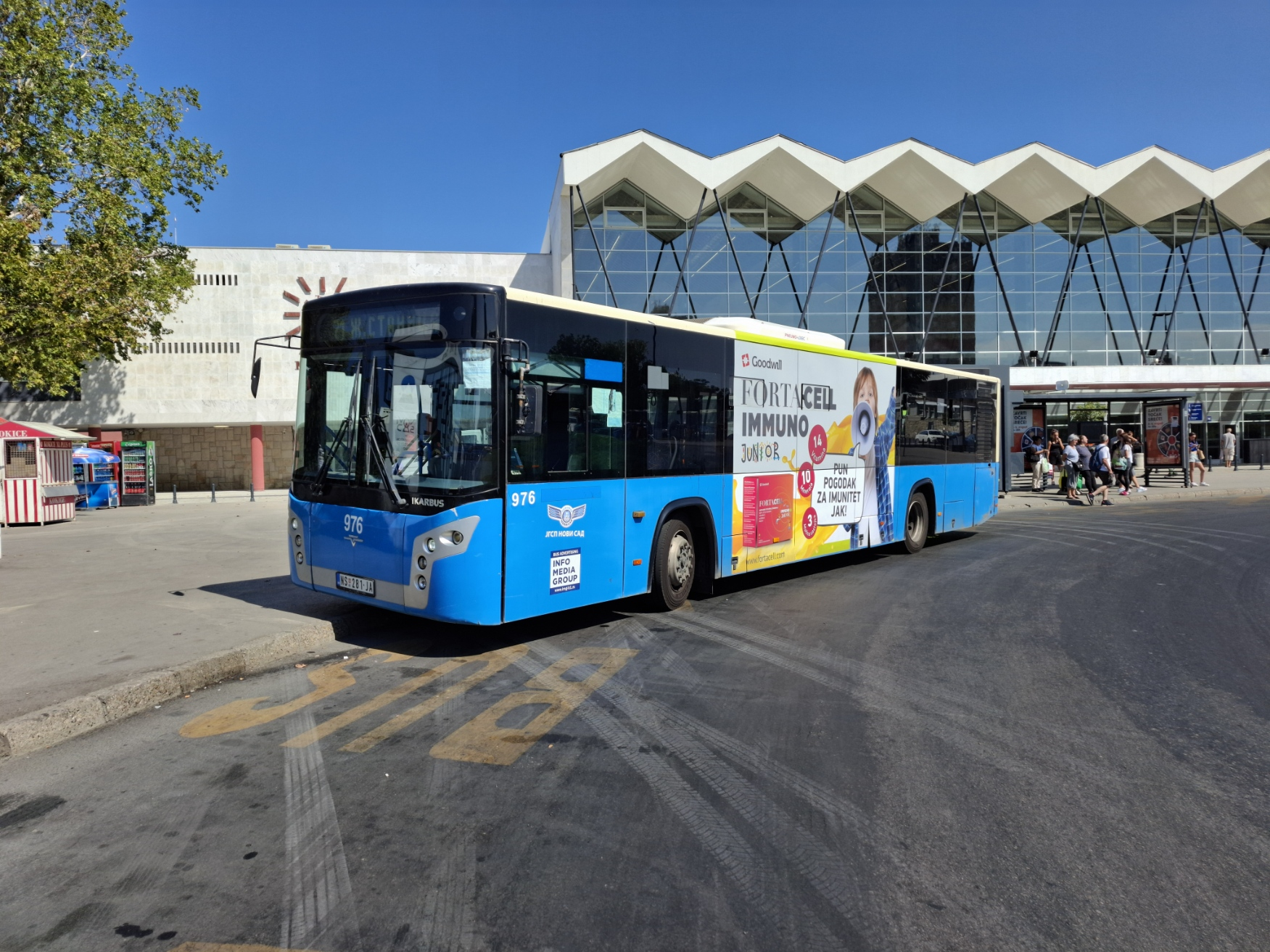
City bus

The main public transportation system in Novi Sad consists of bus lines, operated by the public company JGSP Novi Sad. There are twenty-one urban lines and thirty-five suburban lines, with the main bus terminal being at the northern end of the Liberation Boulevard (Bulevar oslobođenja) next to the Novi Sad railway station, in addition to a smaller terminal in the town center. There are numerous taxi companies serving the city.

The city used to have a tram system, but it was decommissioned in 1957.

Rail and road transport

Novi Sad lies on branch B of the Pan-European Corridor X. The A1 motorway connects the city with Subotica and Hungary to the north and the capital city of Belgrade to the south.

It runs parallel to the Budapest–Belgrade railroad, which connects it to major European cities. On 19 March 2022 the "Soko" (meaning "falcon") high-speed line between Novi Sad and Belgrade opened and runs with 18 departures daily. Its maximum speed is 200 km/h and the 75 kilometres between Belgrade and Novi Sad are covered in 35 minutes. Between Belgrade and Novi Sad there are a total of 60 departures per day. There are three types of trains in total. "Intercity" (SOKO), "Regio-ekspres" and "Regio". On 8 October 2025 the "Soko" high-speed line between Belgrade (via Novi Sad) and Subotica opened and runs with 9 departures daily. Its maximum speed is 200 km/h and the 108 kilometres between Novi Sad and Subotica are covered in 45 minutes.

Novi Sad is connected with Zrenjanin and Timișoara on the northeast and Ruma on south with a regional highway; there are plans to upgrade it to a motorway or an expressway, with a tunnel under the Fruška Gora shortcutting the Iriški Venac mountain pass.

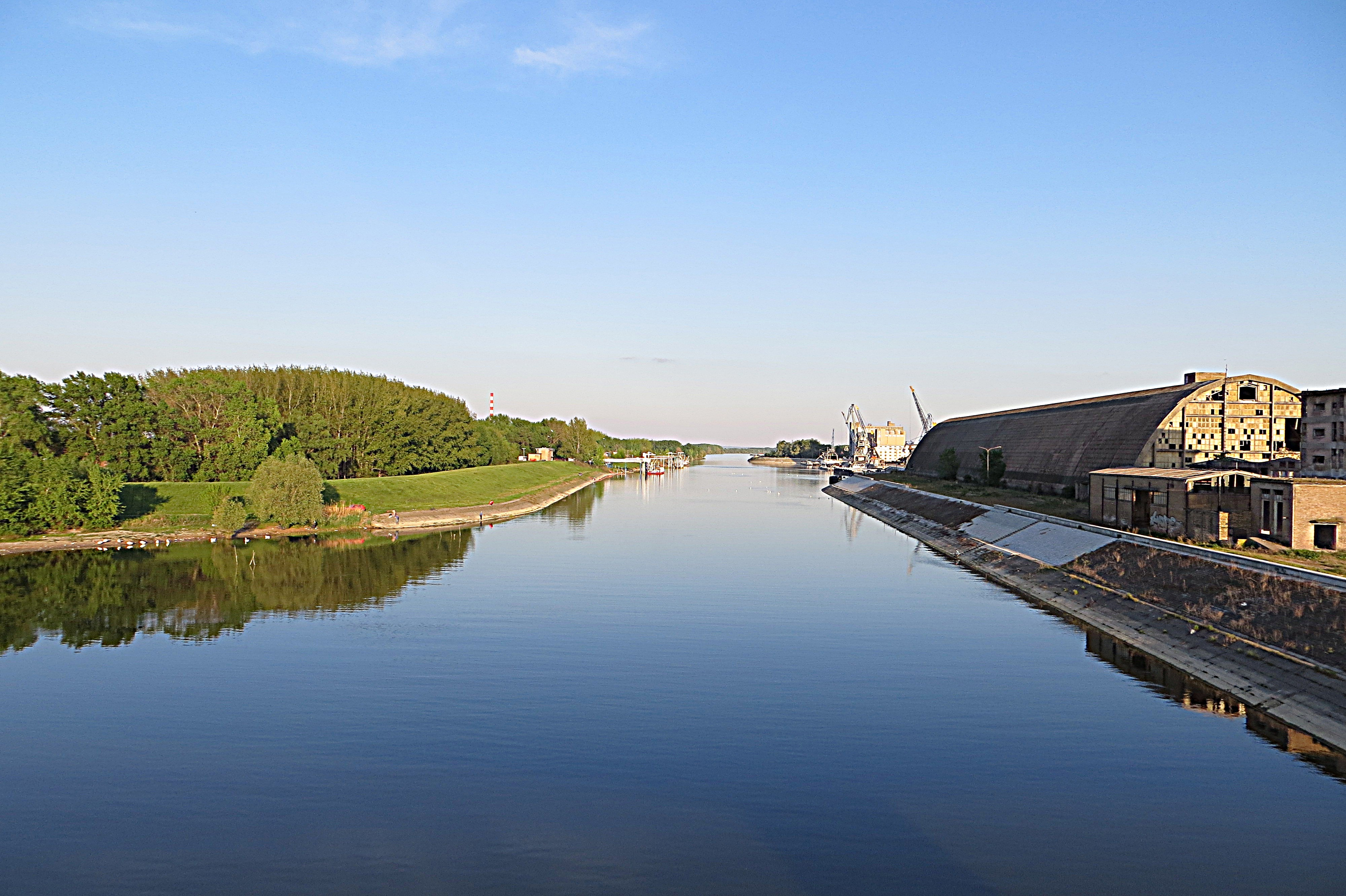
Danube–Tisa–Danube Canal

Three bridges cross the Danube in Novi Sad (as of 2020): Liberty Bridge (Most Slobode) connects Sremska Kamenica with the city proper. Varadin Bridge (Varadinski most) and Žeželj Bridge (Žeželjev most), connects Petrovaradin with city centre, and used for railway and heavy truck traffic. Many bridges also span the Danube-Tisa-Danube canal, running north of the city centre. Currently, two bridges over the Danube are being built, along with two new railway bridges over the Danube-Tisa-Danube canal.

Water transport

The Port of Novi Sad is located on the outskirts of the city on Danube river. Since May 2019 it has been owned by DP WORLD from the UAE. With over a million tonnes of load turnover, it is the largest cargo port in Serbia.

== International relations ==
=== Twin towns – sister cities ===
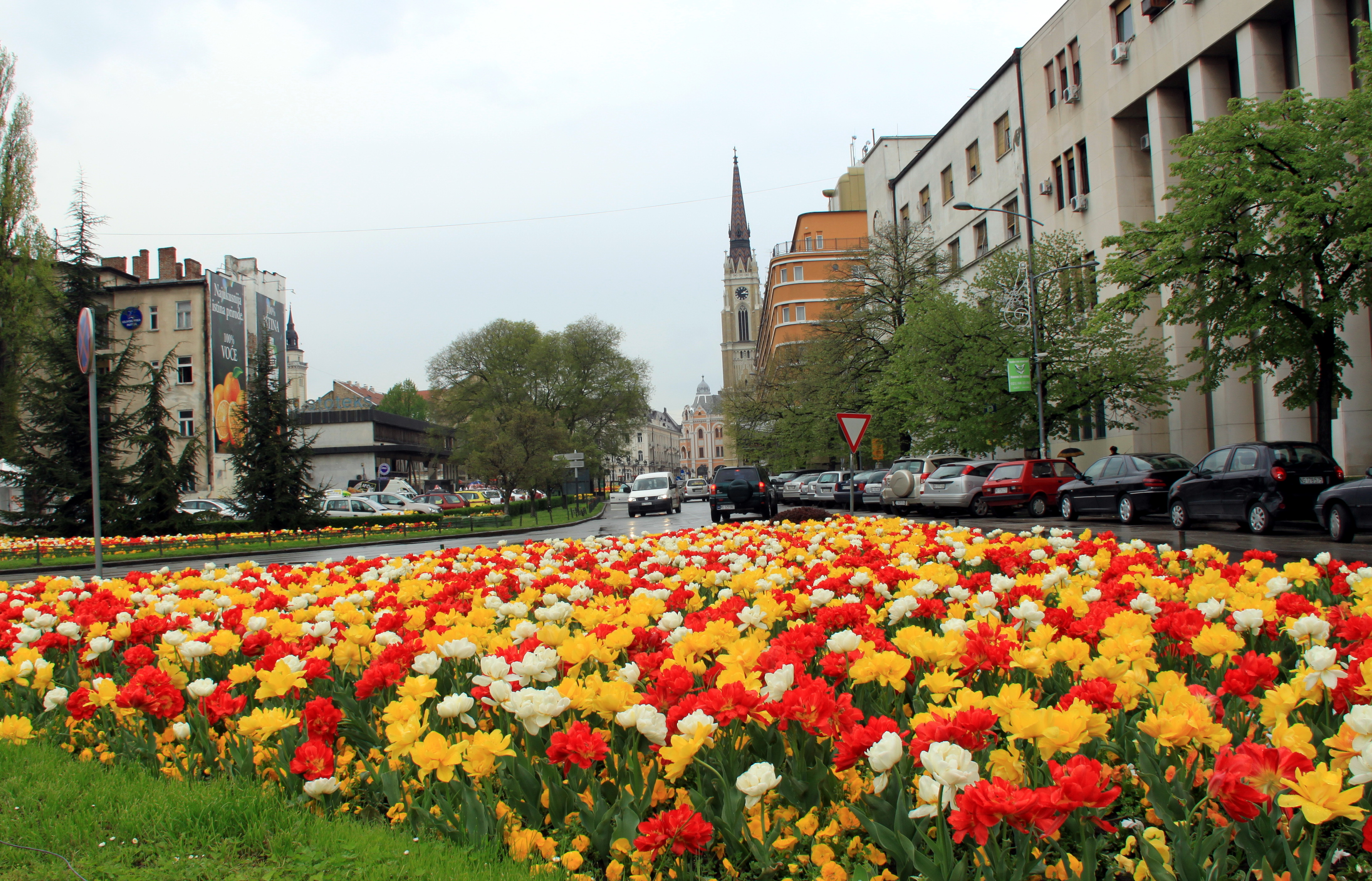
Modena street

Novi Sad has relationships with several twin towns and twin cities. One of the main streets in its city centre is named after Modena in Italy; and likewise Modena has named a park in its town centre Parco di Piazza d'Armi Novi Sad. A city square near the Varadin Bridge is named after Dortmund in Germany; and likewise Dortmund has named a city square Platz von Novi Sad. The Novi Sad Friendship Bridge in Norwich, United Kingdom, by Buro Happold, was also named in honour of Novi Sad. As of October 2023, there plans to establish twin city cooperation with Klagenfurt and Busan.

Novi Sad is twinned with:

- Alexandria, Egypt (2021)
- Budva, Montenegro (1996)
- Changchun, China (1981)
- Cleveland, Ohio, United States (2023)
- Corfu, Greece (2017)
- Dortmund, Germany (1982)
- Gomel, Belarus (2013)
- Ilioupoli, Greece (1994)
- Istočno Sarajevo, Bosnia and Herzegovina (2021)
- Kumanovo, North Macedonia (2019)
- Modena, Italy (1964)
- Nizhny Novgorod, Russia (2006)
- Norwich, England, United Kingdom (1989)
- Oryol, Russia (2017)
- Pécs, Hungary (2009)
- Shiraz, Iran (2023)
- Taverny, France (2020)
- Timișoara, Romania (2005)
- Tivat, Montenegro (2023)
- Toluca, Mexico (2015)

=== Partner cities ===
Most frequent cooperation is done with Budva, Dortmund, Taverny, Timișoara, Tivat and Ulm in the fields of culture, tourism and sports. Besides twin cities, Novi Sad has many signed agreements on joint cooperation with other cities, some of which could potential lead to twin city agreements. (see also: Politics of Novi Sad).

Novi Sad has signed agreements on joint cooperation with cities:

- Banja Luka, Bosnia and Herzegovina (2006)
- Enghien-les-Bains, France (2020)
- Frunzensky District, Saint Petersburg, Russia (2021)
- Gothenburg, Sweden (2002)
- Jinan, China (2025)
- Kranj, Slovenia (2004)
- Krasnodar, Russia
- Lviv, Ukraine (1999)
- Nant, France (2002)
- Osijek, Croatia (2002)
- Saint-Leu-la-Forêt, France (2020)
- Samarkand, Uzbekistan (2026)
- Szeged, Hungary (2001)
- Tuzla, Bosnia and Herzegovina (2002)
- Ulm, Germany (2000)

Novi Sad is an associate member of Eurocities.

== See also ==
- List of people from Novi Sad
- List of honorary citizens of Novi Sad
- List of places in Serbia
- List of cities, towns and villages in Vojvodina
- List of cities and towns on the river Danube

== Bibliography ==
- Agneš Ozer, Petrovaradinska tvrđava – vodič kroz vreme i prostor, Novi Sad, 2002
- Agneš Ozer, Petrovaradin fortress – a guide through time and space, Novi Sad, 2002
- Boško Petrović – Živan Milisavac, Novi Sad – monografija, Novi Sad, 1987
- Branko Ćurčin, Slana Bara – nekad i sad, Novi Sad, 2002
- Branko Ćurčin, Novosadsko naselje Šangaj – nekad i sad, Novi Sad, 2004
- Đorđe Randelj, Novi Sad – slobodan grad, Novi Sad, 1997
- Jovan Mirosavljević, Brevijar ulica Novog Sada 1745–2001, Novi Sad, 2002
- Jovan Mirosavljević, Novi Sad – atlas ulica, Novi Sad, 1998
- Milorad Grujić, Vodič kroz Novi Sad i okolinu, Novi Sad, 2004
- Mirjana Džepina, Društveni i zabavni život starih Novosađana, Novi Sad, 1982
- Petar Jonović, Knjižare Novog Sada 1790–1990, Novi Sad, 1990
- Petar Jonović – Dr Milan Vranić – Dr Dušan Popov, Znameniti knjižari i izdavači Novog Sada, Novi Sad, 1993
- Radenko Gajić, Petrovaradinska tvrđava – Gibraltar na Dunavu, Novi Sad, 1994
- Veljko Milković, Petrovaradin kroz legendu i stvarnost, Novi Sad, 2001
- Veljko Milković, Petrovaradin i Srem – misterija prošlosti, Novi Sad, 2003
- Veljko Milković, Petrovaradinska tvrđava – podzemlje i nadzemlje, Novi Sad, 2005
- Veljko Milković, Petrovaradinska tvrđava – kosmički lavirint otkrića, Novi Sad, 2007
- Zoran Knežev, Novi Sad : Priče iz prošlosti, Novi Sad, 2017
- Zoran Knežev, Vojvodina : Hronike i legende, Novi Sad, 2018
- Zoran Knežev, Novi Sad : Kafanoloija i prostitucija, Novi Sad, 2018
- Zoran Knežev, Novi Sad: Prošlost u pričama, Novi Sad, 2019
- Zoran Knežev, Turistički vodič kroz stari Novi Sad, Novi Sad, 2019
- Zoran Knežev, Vojvodina: Kazivanja i sećanja, Novi Sad, 2021
- Zoran Rapajić, Novi Sad bez tajni, Beograd, 2002
- Zvonimir Golubović, Racija u Južnoj Bačkoj 1942. godine, Novi Sad, 1991
- 30 godina mesne zajednice "7. Juli" u Novom Sadu 1974–2004 – monografija, Novi Sad, 2004
- Enciklopedija Novog Sada, sveske 1–26, Novi Sad, 1993–2005
- Sveske za istoriju Novog Sada, sveske 4–5, Novi Sad, 1993–1994
- Ustav za čitaonicu srpsku u Novom Sadu, Novi Sad, 1993
