= Mirjana Bjelogrlić-Nikolov =

Serbian television journalist and writer

Mirjana Bjelogrlić-Nikolov (Serbian-Cyrillic: Мирјана Бјелогрлић-Николов; born 1961 in Belgrade, Yugoslavia) is a Serbian television journalist and writer.

== Biography ==
Bjelogrlić-Nikolov studied at the Faculty of Philology of the University of Belgrade and graduated with Diploma. She has been working at Radio Television of Serbia for many years. She was editor-in-chief of the editorial board for the cultural program of the public broadcasting corporation from 2006 to 2015, and while working in this position, the new Television show Kulturni dnevnik (Cultural Journal) was included in the Broadcast programming. She was involved in the creation of the legendary episode about Mario Maskareli from the documentary series Ostavština za budućnost (Legacy for Future) in 1988, and she received the Special distinction of Jury for best screenplay of Self-Portrait with White Cat at International Animation Festival Animanima, 2010.

== Awards ==
The author of two prose volumes with short stories received the Isidora Sekulić Award 2007 for her debut work.

== Works ==
Bibliography

- Priče za dosadno popodne (Stories for a boring afternoon), Filip Višnjić Publishing, Belgrade 2007; ISBN 978-86-7363-517-0
- Šegrt lovca na vetrove (The Windhunter Šegrt); Službeni glasnik, Belgrade 2013; ISBN 978-86-519-1784-7

Filmography (selection)

- Tajna celuloida (Secret of Celluloid), screenwriter, Documentary film, RTS 1996.
- Self-Portrait with White Cat, screenwriter of storyline, Animation film about Milena Pavlović-Barili, RTS 2009.
