= Monument to the victims of the raid in Novi Sad =

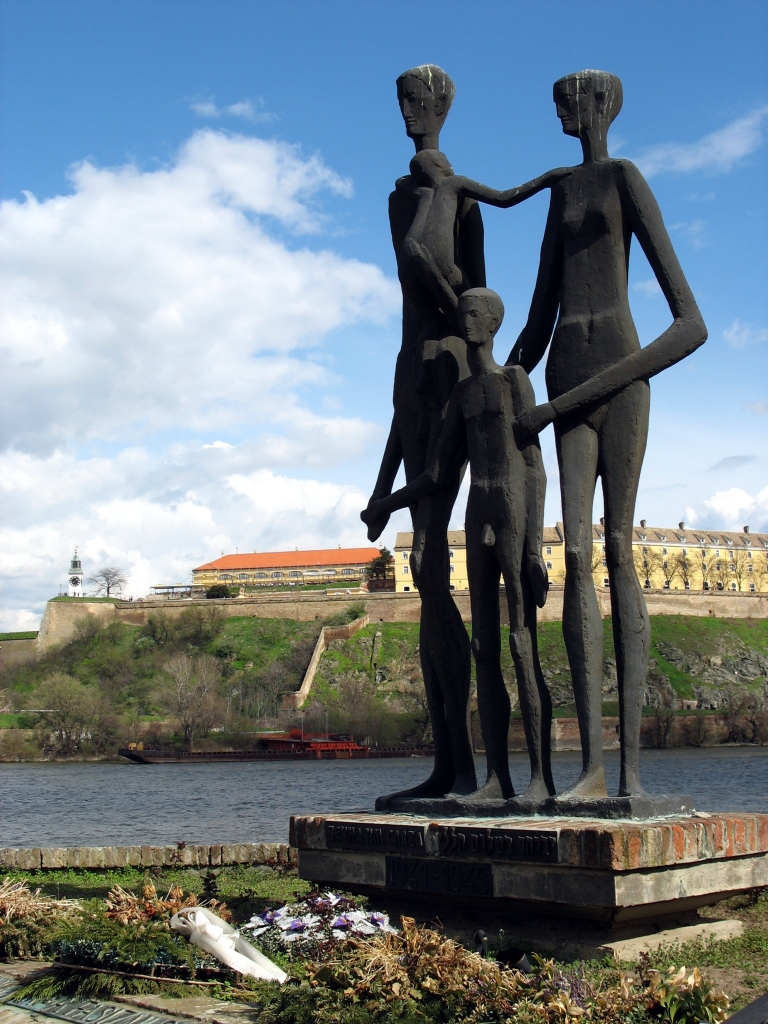
- Interactive map of Monument to the victims of the raid in Novi Sad
- 45°15′08″N 19°51′21″E
- Type: Memorial park
- Location: Novi Sad, Serbia

History
- Built: 1971

Site notes
- Architect: Jovan Soldatović (sculptor)

Cultural Heritage of Serbia
- Type: Historic Landmark of Exceptional Importance

The monument to the victims of the raid in Novi Sad was erected in 1971 in Novi Sad, Serbia, and represents a famous place as an immovable cultural asset of great importance.

== History ==
In Novi Sad, on the quay that today bears the name Quay of the Raid Victims, occupying Hungarian forces carried out a mass shooting of more than a thousand innocent citizens of Novi Sad in the so-called "January Raid" from January 21 to 23, 1942. The bronze composition "The Family", 4 meters tall, dedicated to the victims of the Second World War was erected at that place.

== Creation of the monument ==
The monument is the work of sculptor Jovan Soldatović and was built in 1971. In 1992, the monument was completed with another 78 bronze plates made by the same sculptor. Four plaques (three with text in Serbian and one in Hebrew) describe the event, and 66 plaques contain the names of the murdered persons. Between the plates with the texts are rhythmically arranged plates decorated with the symbols of the Star of David (4 plates), the cross (2) and the eye (1). Below the monument are plaques with texts in Serbian, Hungarian, Slovak and Hebrew.

The plates had been removed but were restored in 2004.

== Gallery ==
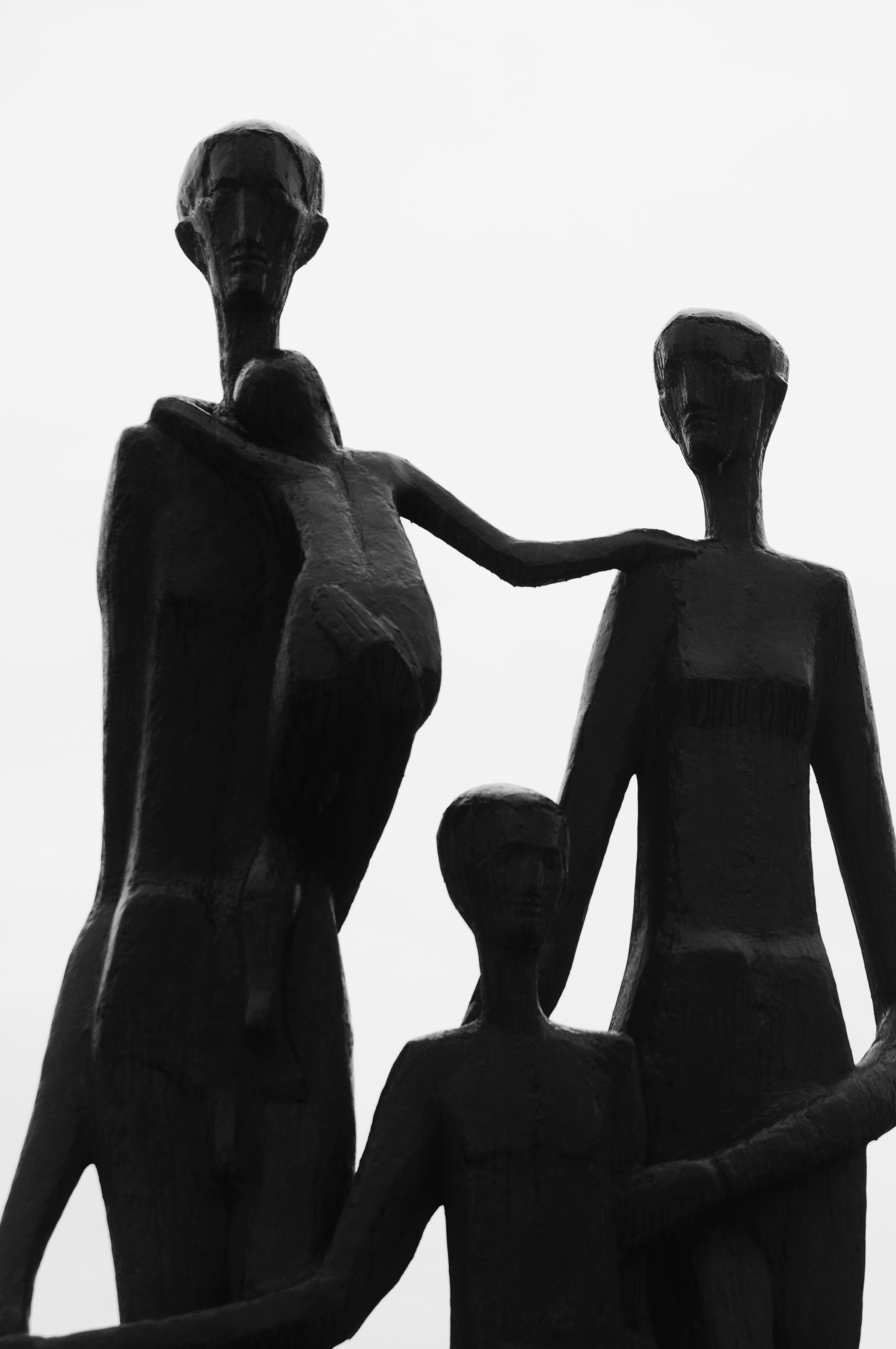

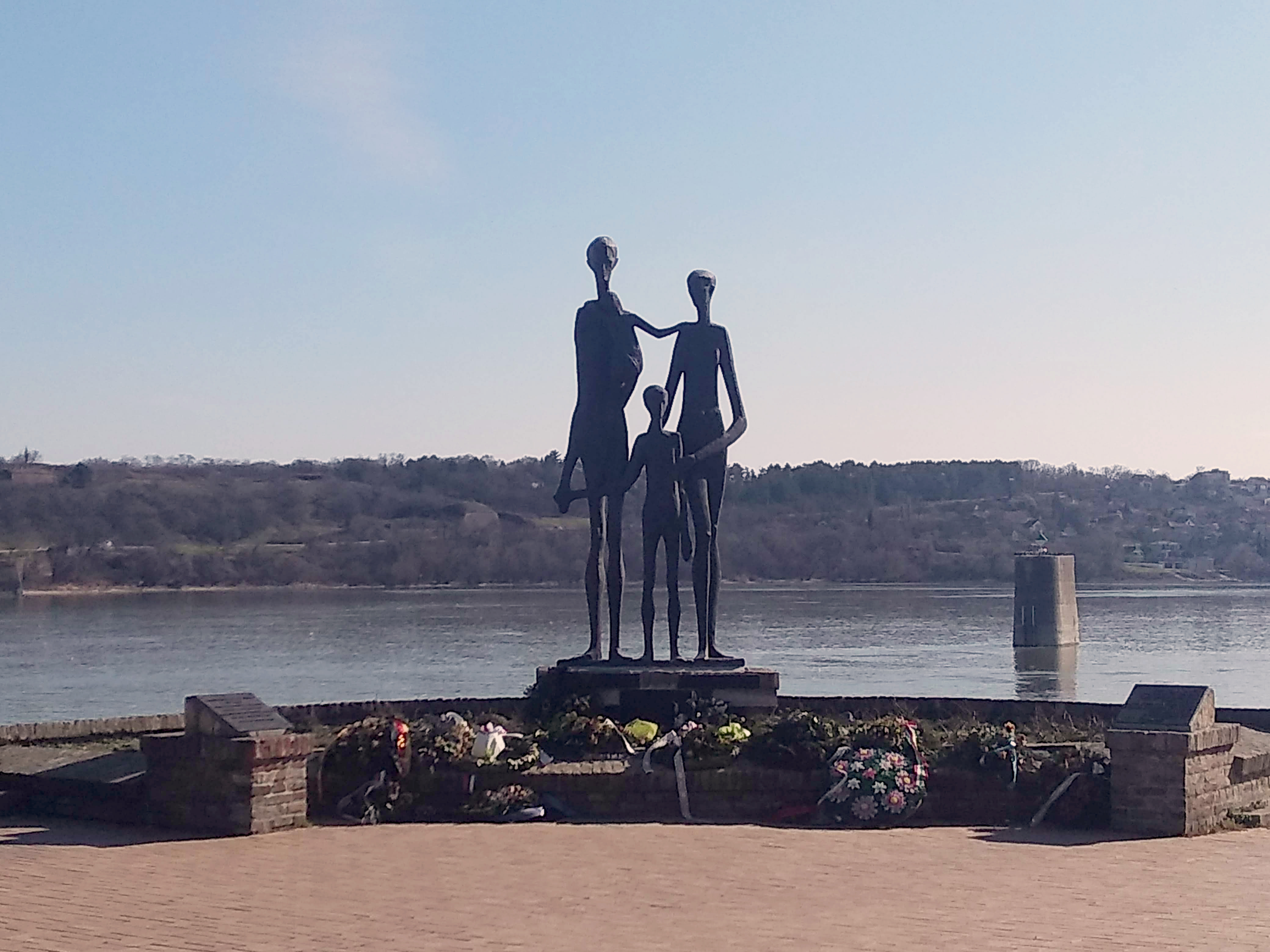

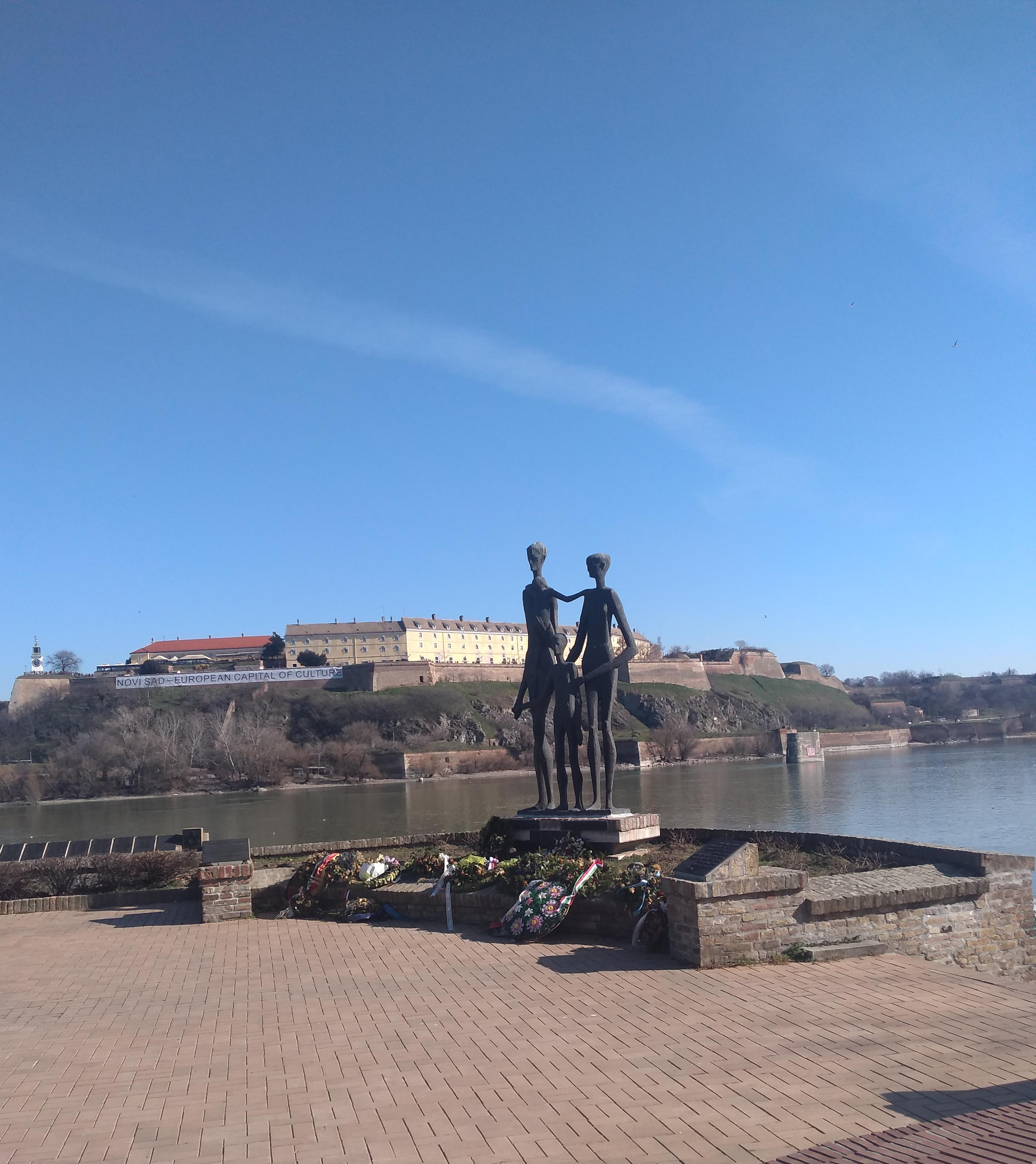

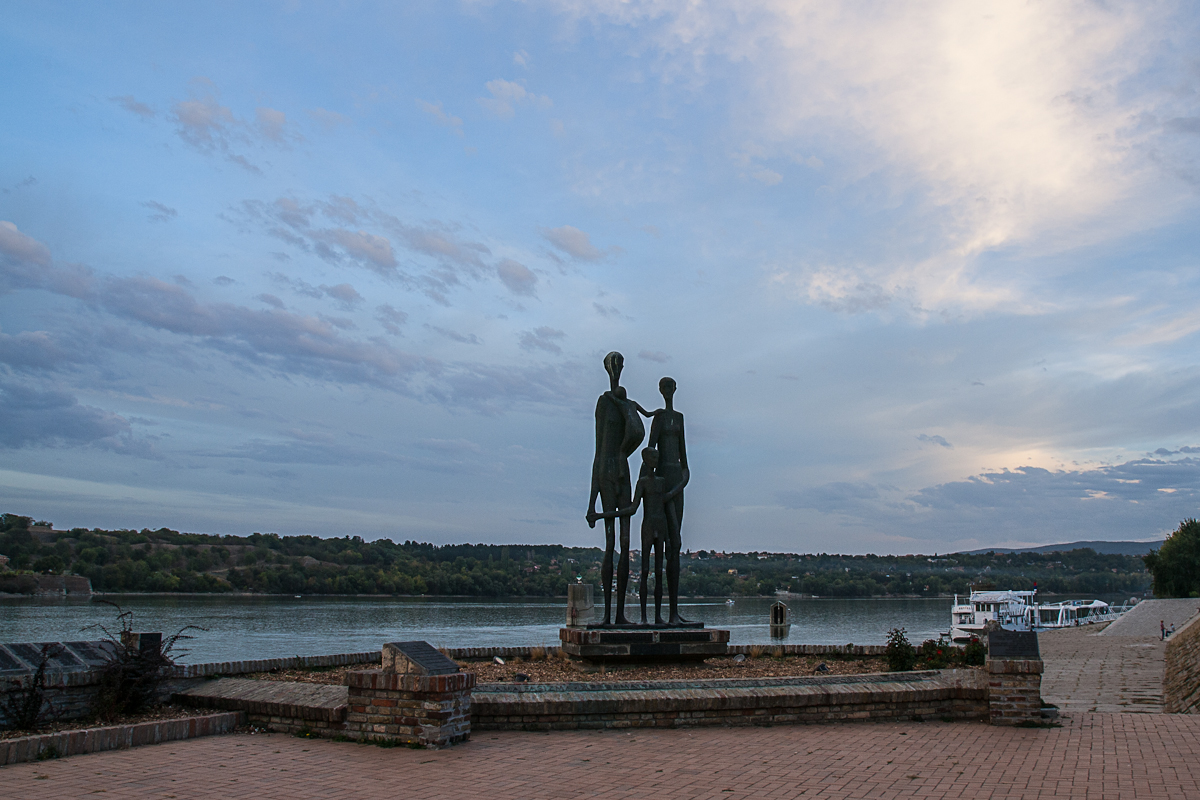

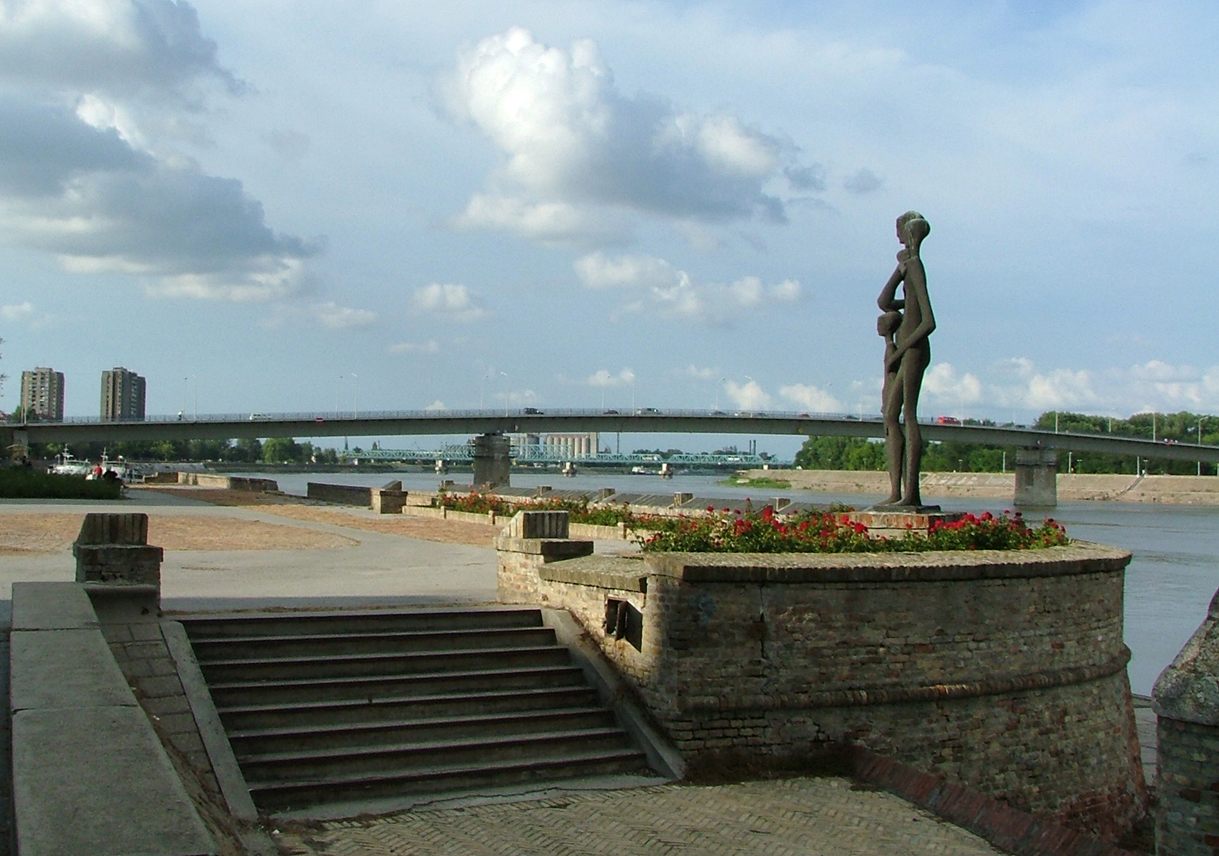

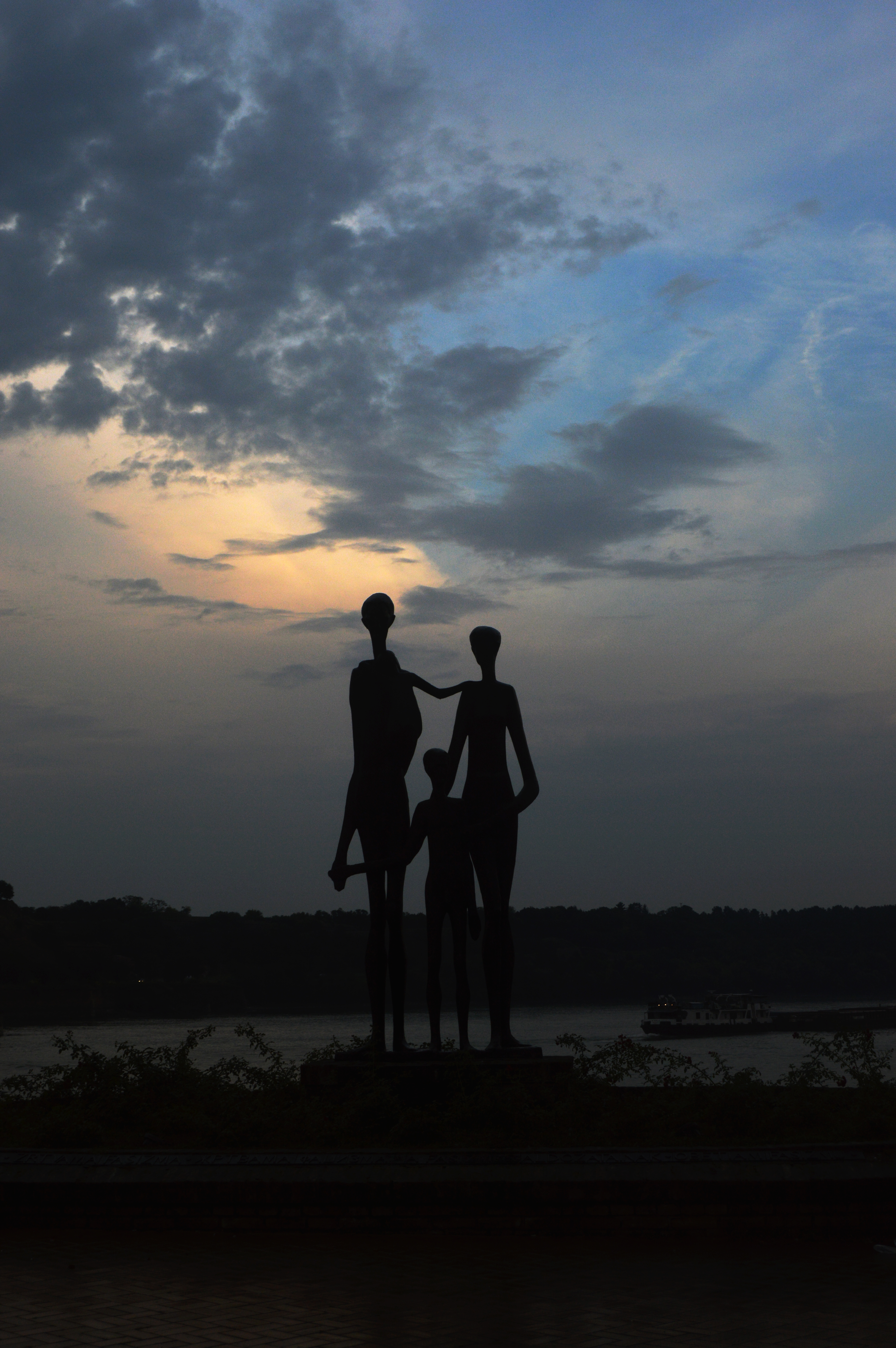
