= Šegrt =

Šegrt is a Serbo-Croatian surname, derived from the word šegrt ("apprentice"), itself originating from Ottoman Turkish şâgird. It is borne by ethnic Serbs and Croats. It may refer to:

- Mirjana Šegrt (born 1950), retired Yugoslav freestyle and butterfly swimmer from Croatia
- Vlado Šegrt, SRBiH President of the Presidium of the People's Assembly (September 1948 - March 1953)
- Petar Segrt, Croatian-born German football coach
- Rade Šegrt, Bosnian Serb author
- Miloš Šegrt, Bosnian Serb guslar
- David Šegrt (born 1999), Serbian Powerlifter and two-time world champion in the bench press.

== See also ==
- Lapitch the Little Shoemaker (film) (Čudnovate zgode šegrta Hlapića), Croatian animated film
