= Jovan Soldatović =

Serbian sculptor (1920–2005)

Jovan Soldatović Јован Солдатовић
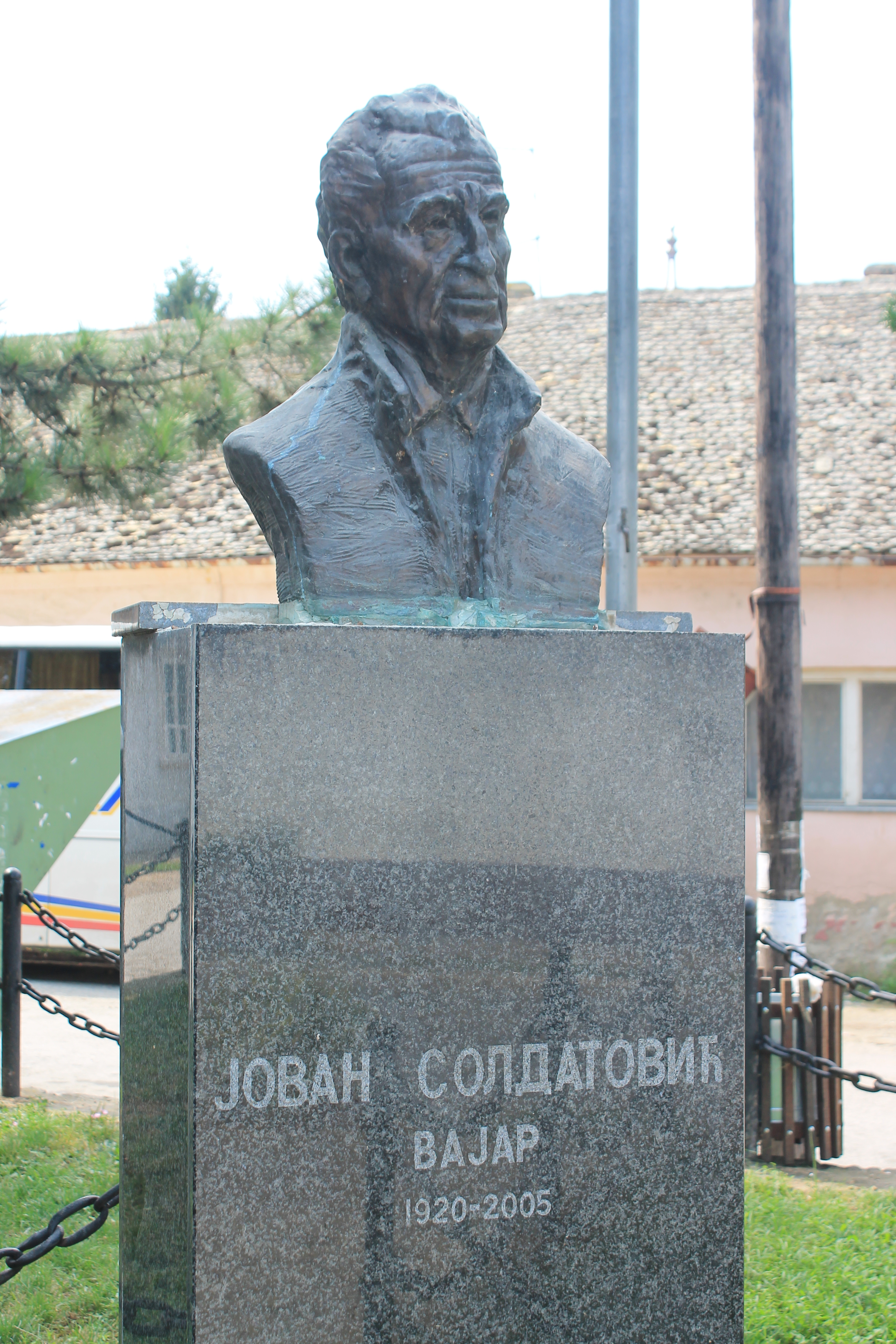
- A bust of Soldatović in Čerević
- Born: November 26, 1920; Čerević, Kingdom of Serbs, Croats, and Slovenes
- Died: October 7, 2005 (aged 84); Novi Sad, Serbia and Montenegro
- Known for: Sculptor
- Movement: surrealism
- Website: jovan.soldatovic.org

Jovan Soldatović (November 26, 1920 – October 7, 2005) was a Serbian and Yugoslav sculptor, internationally recognized for hundreds of sculptures and memorials. He was one of the most prominent modern Serbian sculptors, a leading artistic personality in contemporary Novi Sad and a member of the Prostor 8 art group from Belgrade.

== Private life ==
He was born on 26 November 1920 in Čerević. His family moved to Novi Sad in 1930, in the area of Little Liman, near the location of future Banovina Palace. He graduated from Jovan Jovanović Zmaj Gymnasium in Novi Sad in 1939. In 1940 he finished to Officer´s School in Maribor and starts his studies in the architecture department in the Technical Faculty of the University of Belgrade. With the start of World War II in Yugoslavia he would stop his studies in Belgrade and move back to Novi Sad. He participated in World War II as a member of Yugoslav partisans 7th Vinkovac regiment. In 1945 after the war he would marry Mila Mrazović. He graduated from the Academy of Fine Arts in Belgrade in 1948. On 3 July 1948, his first son Srđan was born. On 18 March 1956, his second son Goran was born. Some time in his life he would divorce his wife and marry his second wife Mirjana. Both of his wives would tragically lose their lives in 1999 (Mirjana in June due to a car accident, Mila in August from natural causes).

Soldatović died on 7 October 2005 in Novi Sad and was buried at a cemetery in Čerević.

== Career ==
On 9 November 1949, he would start working at Toma Rosandić workshop in Belgrade along with Ana Bešlić, Olga Jančić, Sava Sandić, Ante Gržetić and Ratimir Stojadinović.

He would work in Toma Rosadnić workshop there until 1953, where he would move back to Novi Sad. There he would become the first professor of sculpture at the painting department of the Teacher Training School. At the same time, he is leading the initiative to establish an art studio at the Petrovaradin Fortress and is among the first to establish his studio space in the so-called building Duga kasarna (Long barracks). Soldatovic will work in the studio for more than half a century, until his death in 2005. Around the same year he would become a member of the Udruženja likovnih umetnika Srbije ULUS and then a member of the Udruženja likovnih umetnika Vojvodine ULUV.

First exhibited in 1949. He had several solo exhibitions in Belgrade (1952) and Novi Sad (1958, 1968, 1999, 2002). He participated in a number of joint exhibitions by The Applied Artists and Designers Association of Serbia, the Association of Art Artists of Vojvodina, Prostor 8 in Belgrade (1954), the Mediterranean Biennale in Alexandria (1955), World Exhibition in Brussels (1958), the Fifth International Biennale of Sculpture at the Open in Middelheim in a park near Antwerp (1958), First NOB exhibition of Yugoslav artists in Belgrade (1961), Second International Exchibition of Sculptures in Musée Rodin of Paris (1961), Second NOB exhibition of Yugoslav artists in Belgrade (1966), the October Salon in Belgrade (1970), Third NOB exhibition of Yugoslav artists in Belgrade (1971) the Salon in Rijeka, the Triennale in Belgrade, and several representative contemporary exhibitions such as those in Sremski Karlovci, Kovilj, Sombor, Zagreb, Kikinda, Petrovaradin, Slavonski Brod and Negotin.

He was a member of the "Prostor 8" (Space 8) art group. In the period of 1957 and 1958, Soldatovic was the main promoter of a sculpture exhibition in the free space of Group 8, at Tašmajdan Park in Belgrade and at the Petrovaradin Fortress in Novi Sad. Since then, sculptures of Soldatović, Aleksandar Zarin, Ana Bešlić and Ratimir Stojadinovic have been permanently placed at the fortress. The exhibition is the beginning of Soldatovic's obsessive idea to turn the plateau at the Petrovaradin Fortress into a place to exhibit sculptures.

In 1968, Soldatović set up a monumental exhibition of his sculptures at the Petrovaradin Fortress. The exhibition was dedicated to the Year of Human Rights and was held under the auspices of UNESCO. On that occasion, Soldatović established a correspondence with U Thant, the then Secretary-General of the United Nations. More than 50,000 visitors attended the event, including the Yugoslav President Josip Broz Tito.

In 1972, he works on establishing and organizing the Academy of Arts in Novi Sad, which emerged from the Training School. There he would become an associate professor of the arts in 1975. In the 1981 re-election Academy of Arts, he was nominated for a permanent professor position. Because of his relationship with the collective, he was not accepted even as an associate professor. He would then accept a national pension.

In 1985, Soldatović would move to his new and final workshop at the Petrovaradin Fortress, behind the Academy of Arts.

In 1994, Soldatović was nominated for academic membership at the Serbian Academy of Sciences and Arts. The reasoning was written by Milan Konjović since November of 1990, but was not accepted. Two sculptors, Svetomir Basara and Nikola Janković were admitted to SANU on 13 October 1994 instead.

During the NATO bombing of Novi Sad in the period of 24 March to 10 June 1999, Soldatović would regularly work in his workshop. Even after the bombing and the destruction of all three bridges across the Danube, he would travel to his workshop ether by ferry or by boat. He would open up an exhibition at the ruins of the Varadin Bridge on 14 April, at the height of the intensive bombing of Novi Sad and Yugoslavia. The exhibition opened in front of the Novi Sad Club by Dr Aleksandar Lučić.

In 2001, on the occasion of the 80th birthday of Jovan Soldatović, a formal reception was held at the Assembly of Vojvodina by the then president Nenad Čanak.

In 2002, on the 50th anniversary of his first independent art exhibition, Soldatović would again exhibit at the Graphic Collective Gallery in Belgrade, also displaying some of his new works.

In 2003, thanks to the engagement of Gallery BEL ART and the gallerist Nabuko Akikawa from Japan, the sculpture of Čovek sa mrtvim detom (Man with a dead child), sculpted in 1961, became a permanent fixture of the Hiroshima City Museum of Contemporary Art. The handover took place at the Gallery BEL ART at the exhibition dedicated to this sculpture and was then taken over by Japanese representatives. On that occasion, Japan's ambassador to Belgrade, Ryūichi Tanabe, hosted a special reception for Jovan Soldatović at his Belgrade residence. The same year, the Gallery of Vojvodina Bank in Novi Sad held a representative exhibition of three great Vojvodina artists: Milan Konjović, Jovan Soldatović and Boško Petrović.

In 2005, at the Aspekti grand exhibition of contemporary sculpture in Vojvodina (held between August and September), a separate exhibition, Homagge a Jovan Soldatović was set up in honor of Soldatović by the art critic Sava Stepanov. This would be the last exhibition of Jovan Soldatović during his lifetime, which he was unable to attend the opening of due to his illness.

== Works ==
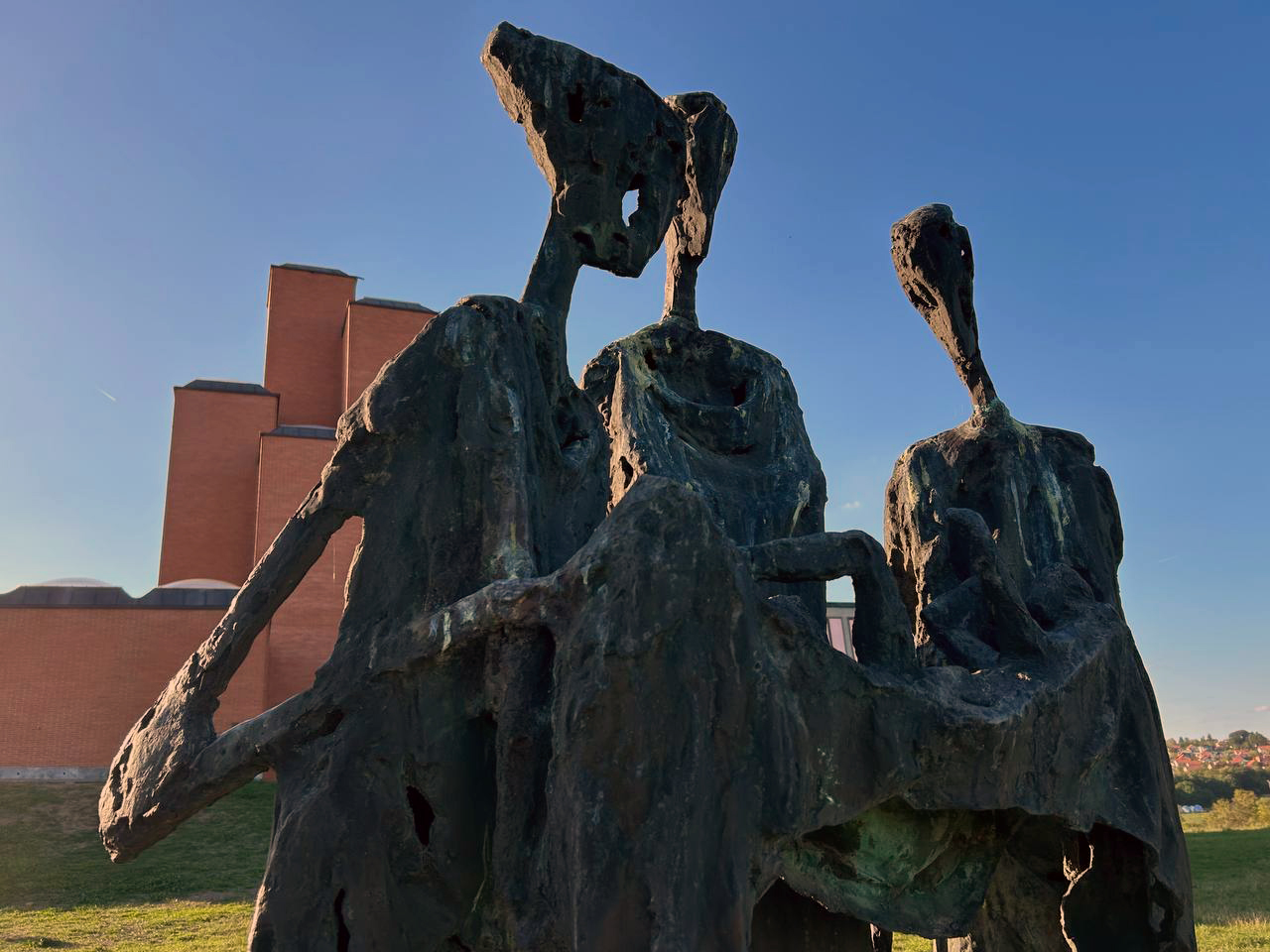
Judges by Soldatović

He's the author of numerous sculptures and monuments between 1946 and 2005. Works by him appear in numerous museums and private collections. Soldatović also created around hundred of sculptures erected in public spaces. Most of his work was done in bronze. He also worked with gold, copper, wood, wax, gypsum, concrete and bricks. Most of his works had an anti-war and humanitarian theme, with others depicting the natural world through animals such as deer, storks, cranes and horses. He would often recreate his sculptures in different sizes and materials.

In 1961, at the International Fashion Fair in Belgrade, the Zlatna košuta (Golden Dow) award was established. The award is a sculpture of a dow, originally sculpted by Soldatović in 1955, quickly became one of his most popular works.

His most recognized works were done in 1962. The Streljani rodoljubi (Shot patriots) statues in Crna Ćuprija Memorial Park near Žabalj were done to commemorate the fallen soldiers of the Šajkaš Partizan regiment. The Porodica (Family) statue was placed between the Sunny Quay and Belgrade Quay in Novi Sad, overlooking the Danube and the Petrovaradin Fortress. It was done to commemorate the Victims of the Novi Sad raid of 1942.

In 1971, Soldatović would design and create the Štafeta mladosti (Relay of youth) for Yugoslav Youth Day. That year the relay would start its journey from Vojvodina, from Iriški Venac and was given to Josip Broz Tito for his 80th birthday.

In 1999, after the NATO bombing of Varadin Bridge, Soldatović would set up an exhibition composed from the installation Dođe li rat – odoše ljudi (1972) at the ruins of the bridge.

The last Soldatović work to be finished and placed in a public space posthumously were the Statue of Milan Konjović on 1 June 2017 and the Statue of Confucius in Belgrade on 17 June 2017. The Statue of Milan Konjović was placed in front of the Gallery of Matica Srpska for its reopening after extensive restoration period. Originally the Statue of Confucius was intended for the Chinese Embassy located in New Belgrade, the gypsum version of the statue was left in storage due to the NATO bombing of Yugoslavia and the bombing of the Chinese embassy. Currently the completed work is located in front of the Chinese Cultural Center, Belgrade where the original Chinese Embassy once stood.

- Impression of Pesma o keruši/A Song About a Dog of Sergei Yesenin, gypsum, Art pavilion, Belgrade, 1951
- A lyrical motif, wood, Art pavilion, Belgrade, 1951
- Mati/Mother, gypsum, Art pavilion, Belgrade, 1951
- Prva Ljubav/First Love, bronze, Belgrade, 1951
- Sedeći sa pijacom, bronze, Novi Sad, 1953
- Muzika/Music, bronze, Novi Sad, 1955
- Košuta/Dow, bronze, Belgrade, 1955
- Rode/Storks, bronze, World Exhibition, Brussels, Belgium, 1958
- Jelen/Deer, gypsum, Tašmajdan Park, Belgrade, 1958
- Dvoje, gypsum, Novi Sad, 1960
- Dvoje, bronze, The Gallery of Fine Arts – Gift Collection of Rajko Mamuzić, Novi Sad, 1961
- Lighthouse on the Danube, concrete and brick, Surduk, 1961
- Čovek sa mrtvim detom/Man with a dead child, bronze, Hiroshima City Museum of Contemporary Art, Hiroshima, Japan, 1961 (permanently display in 2003)
- Zlatna košuta/Golden Dow, gold, International Fashion Fair, Belgrade, 1961
- Streljani rodoljubi/Shot patriots, bronze, "Crna Ćuprija" Memorial Park, Žabalj, 1962
- Porodica/Family Monument to the Victims of the Fascism, bronze, Novi Sad at the Sunny Quay on the banks of the Danube river, 1962 (originally displayed in Tašmajdan Park in Belgrade in 1958)
- Jeleni u borbi/Deer Fighting, bronze, Petrovaradin Fortress, Novi Sad, 1965
- Dvoje, in front of the Headquarters of the United Nations, New York, 1967
- Jelen i tri košute/Male Deer and Three Does, bronze, Sremska Kamenica
- Igra/Play, bronze, Institute for Oncology of Vojvodina, Sremska Kamenica
- Doe and Fawn, bronze, Villa Mir, Belgrade
- Doe and Fawn, bronze, Zrenjanin
- Šest košuta/Six Does, Jajce, Bosnia and Herzegovina
- Monument to the Victims of Fascism, Čurug, 1970s
- Suđaje/Judges, bronze, Novi Sad, 1970
- Most razmene/Bridge of Exchange, concrete and brick, Stejanovci, 1971
- Statue of Branko Radičević, bronze, Sremski Karlovci, 1971
- Štafeta mladosti/Relay of youth, bronze, 1971
- Dođe li rat – odoše ljudi, bronze, Novi Sad, 1972 (temporarily displayed next to ruins of Varadin Bridge in 1999)
- Razigrani konji/Playful Horses, bronze, Novi Sad Fair, Novi Sad, 1972
- Portrait of Miloš Crnjanski, gypsum, Novi Sad, 1972
- Euripid-Sartr scenery statue, gypsum, National Theatre, Subotica, 1973
- Monument to the Victims of Fascism, concrete and bricks, Titel, 1974
- Bust of Sava Tekelija, bronze, in front of Matica Srpska, Novi Sad, 1976
- Bust of Dušan Vikasović, bronze, Sombor
- Bust of Žarko Zrenjanin, bronze, Sombor
- Bust of Veljko Dugošević, bronze, Sombor
- Two chamois, bronze, National Library, Sombor
- Bust of Vasilj Gaćeša, bronze, Apatin
- Bust of Stojan Matić, bronze, Apatin
- Bust of Anka Matić Grozda, bronze, Irig
- Bust of Ćira Milekić, bronze, Sremska Mitrovica
- "The Child and the Fawn", bronze, Zrenjanin
- Monument to the National Liberation Struggle, bronze and concrete, Ruma
- Monument to the National Liberation Struggle, bronze, Čurug on the banks of the Tisa river
- Monument to the National Liberation Struggle, brick and bronze, Neštin on the banks of the Danube
- Monument to the National Liberation Struggle, bronze and concrete, Pačir
- Monument to the National Liberation Struggle, bronze and concrete, Titel
- Monument to the Fighters of the National Liberation Struggle and the Victims of Fascism 1941 – 1945, concrete and bricks, Đurđevo
- Majka i Dete/Mother and a child bronze, Monument to the Victims of Fascism, Čurug
- Majka i Dete/Mother and a child, bronze, Banja Luka, Bosnia & Herzegovina
- Suđaje/Judges, bronze, Šumarice Memorial Park, Kragujevac, 1975
- Bez Iluzija/A Man Without Illusions, bronze, Šumarice Memorial Park, Kragujevac, 1975
- Composition, bronze, Šumarice Memorial Park, Kragujevac, 1979
- Don Quixote, bronze, Tašmajdan Park, Belgrade, 1979
- Ikebana na zgarištu/Ikebana at the fire pit, bronze, Novi Sad, 1980
- Statue of Jovan Sterija Popović, bronze, Vršac, 1981
- Statue of Đura Jakšić, bronze, in front of Đura Jakšić´s Home in Skadarlija, Belgrade, 1982
- Statue of Đura Jakšić, bronze, Danube Park, Novi Sad, 1982
- Jelen u trku/Deer in a race, bronze, bronze, Igman, Bosnia and Herzegovina, 1984
- The Kiss/Poljub, bronze, Park of Peace, Slovenj Gradec, Slovenia, 1984
- Monument to the National Liberation Struggle, bronze and concrete, Žabalj, 1985
- Ranjen jelen/Wounded deer, bronze, Negotin, 1985
- Statues of humans and animals, gypsum, "Syrmian Front" Memorial Park, Šid, 1987
- Bust of Vuk Karadžić, bronze, Novi Sad, 1987
- Statue of Arsenije III Crnojević, bronze, Sremski Karlovci, 1990 (temporary display)
- Statue of Arsenije III Crnojević, bronze, Ibarski Kolašin, 1992
- Rika jelena/Roar of a deer, bronze, Apatin, 1995
- Statue of Kosta Trifković, Kosta Trifković primary school, Novi Sad, 2004
- Statue of Milan Konjović, bronze, Gallery of Matica Srpska, Novi Sad, 2017 (posthumously)
- Statue of Confucius, bronze, Chinese Cultural Center, Belgrade, 2017 (posthumously)

== Prizes and awards ==
- Politika Award for Art, Ečka, 1958
- 2nd Place Award for his sculpture at the First NOB exhibition of Yugoslav artists, 1961
- October Award of Novi Sad, Novi Sad, 1962
- October Salon Award, Belgrade, 1970
- Charter of the City of Novi Sad, 1981
- July 7th Award, 1986
- Order of Merits for the People (Yugoslavia), 1986
- Forum Award for Fine Arts, 1986
- Vuk Award, 1999

== Legacy ==
In 1968, Soldatovic's sculpture Family would appear as the motif of a stamp issued by the Post Office of Yugoslavia on the occasion of the Year of Human Rights, which was indicated by the official sign of the jubilee. The postage stamp was worth 1.25 dinars and 500,000 copies were issued for the event.

In 2000, the Novi Sad Građanski placed Jovan Soldatović among the 20 of the most influential citizens of Novi Sad of the 20th century, along with Vasa Stajić, Miroslav Antić, Dragiša Brašovan, Pera Dobrinović, Aleksandar Tišma, Vujadin Bošković, Monica Seles, etc.

A permanent museum exhibition of his life, career and sculptural works can be found at the Homeland Museum of Čerević.

Soldatović′s Petrovaradin "Long barracks" workshop, was left in the ownership of the City of Novi Sad after his death. For years this workshop was mishandled by the city, leaving it in disrepair. Around June 2013, over 61 of the 100 statues done in gypsum, wax, copper and bronze were stolen from his workshop. Only 23 statues were able to be found while the 38 remaining sculptures were either destroyed or sold on the black market to private auctions, galleries and collections. This was not the first time his workshop was broken in, as it also happened in 1972, where 6 of his sculptures were destroyed.

On 1 February 2021, during the City Day of Novi Sad, the City Museum of Novi Sad, with the help of Dr. Jelena Banjac, a museum advisor in the collection of foreign art, hosted an exhibition of Jovan Soldatović′s works from the Foundation of the National Gallery, at Dunavska 29. The entrance was free of charge for visitors during the City Day holiday. In December of that same year, for the 100th anniversary of Soldatović′s birth, Dr. Tijana Palkovljević Bugarski and Mr. Danilo Vuksanović wrote an article for Gallery of Matica Srpska, honoring the sculptor who has graced Matica Srpska with many of his works.

== Gallery ==
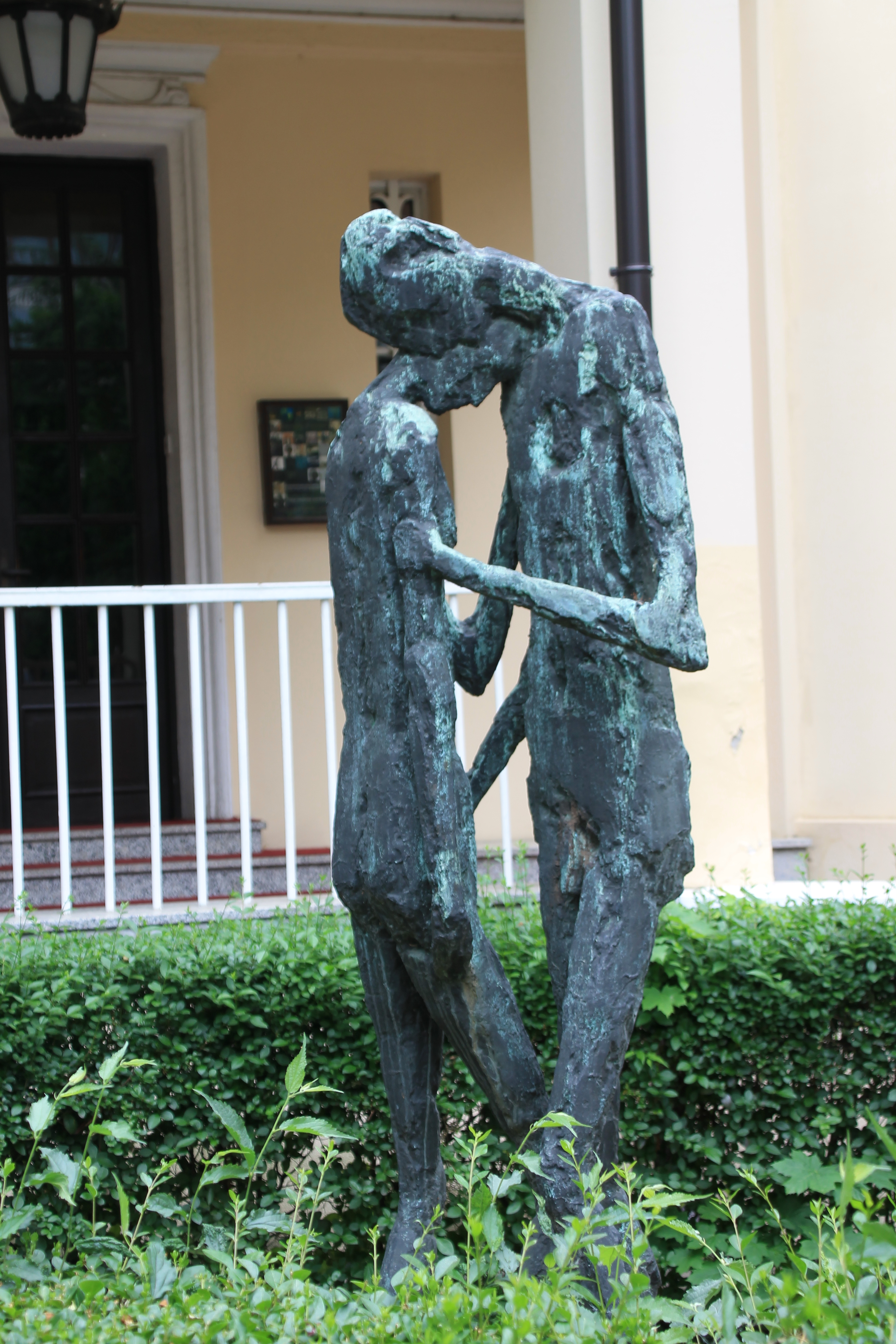
Dvoje Monument in front of The Gallery of Fine Arts – Gift Collection of Rajko Mamuzić, Novi Sad, 1961

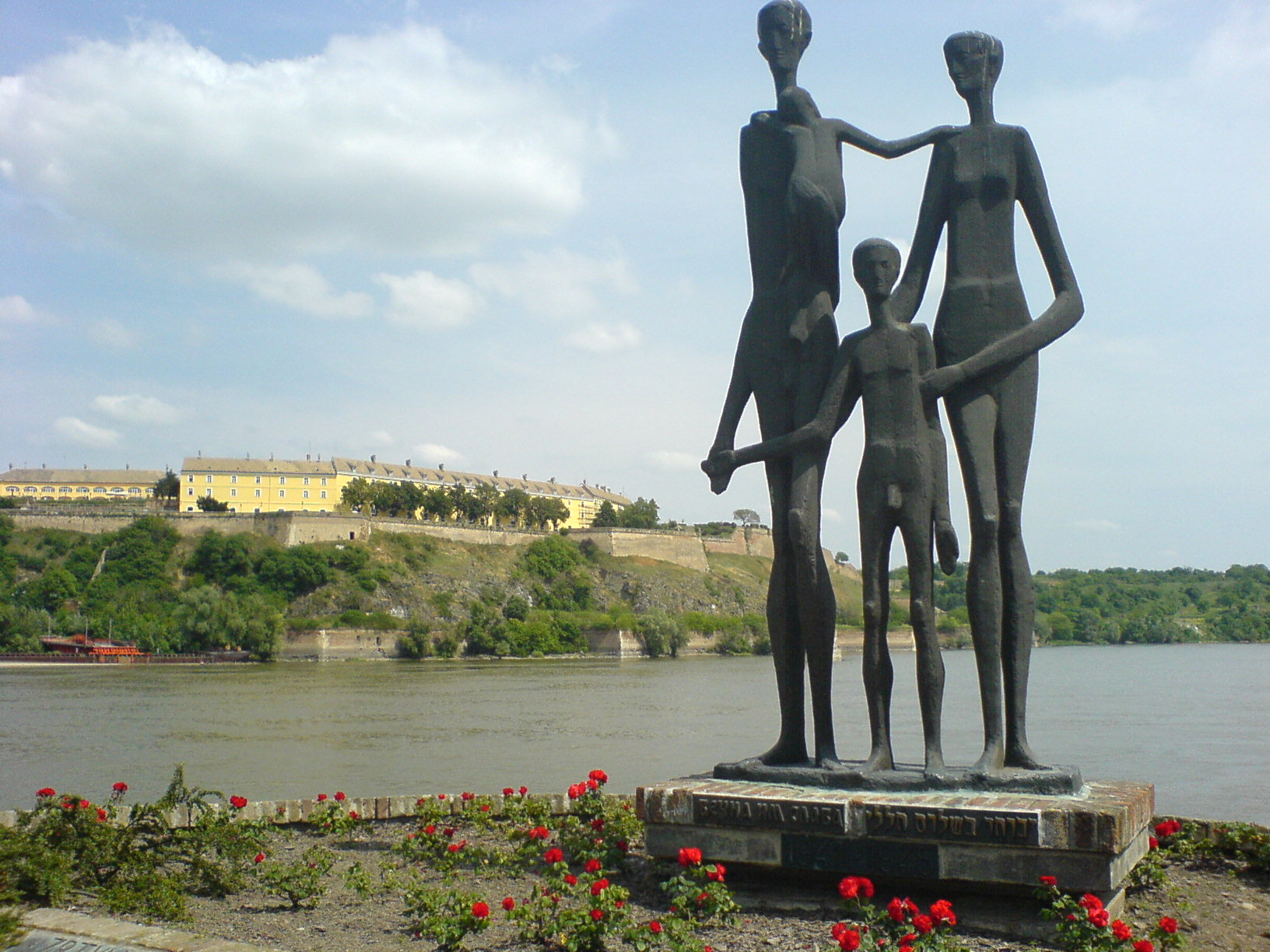
Family Monument to the Victims of Fascism, Novi Sad, 1962

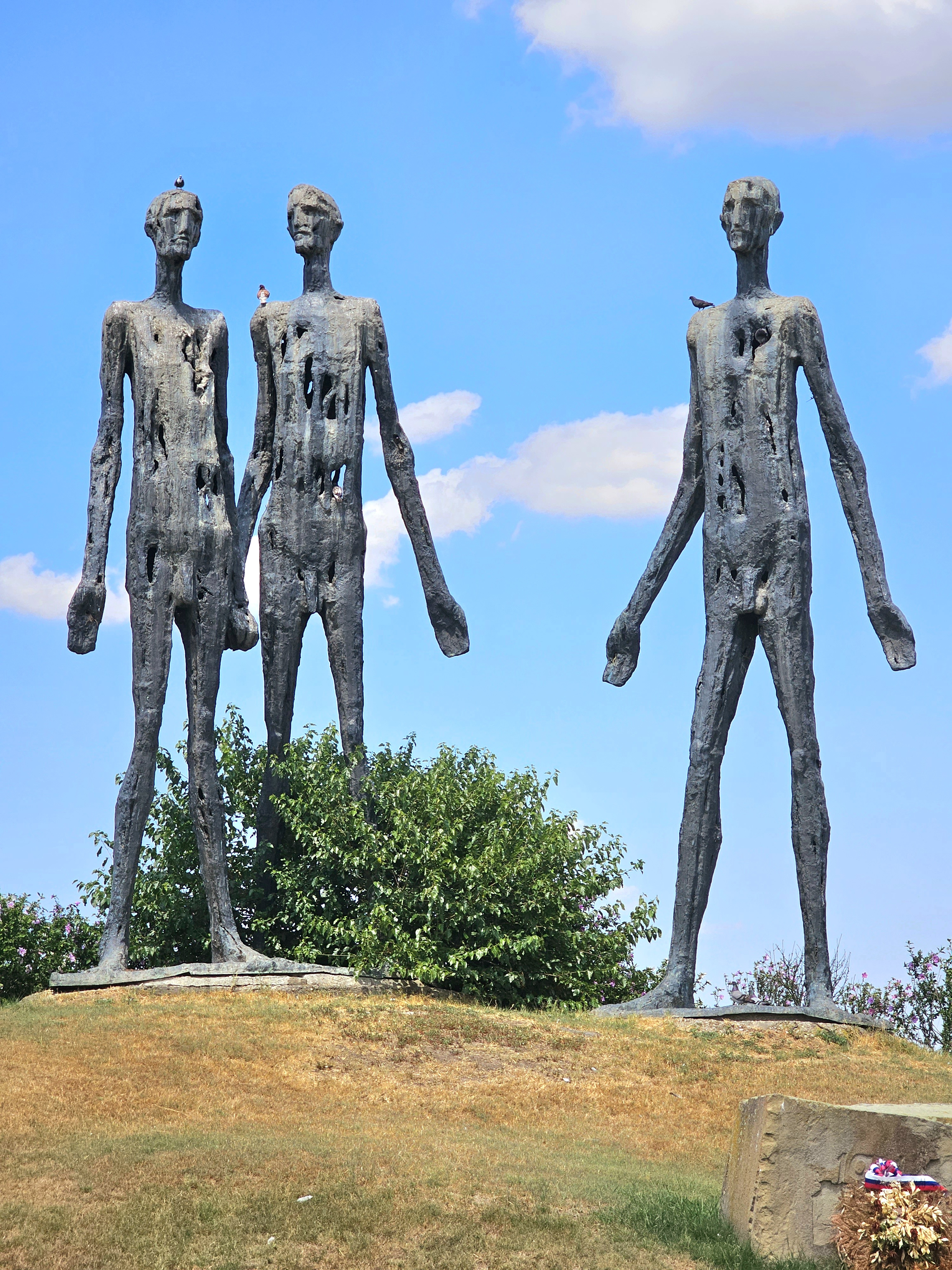
Shot patriots, "Crna Ćuprija" Memorial Park, Žabalj, 1962

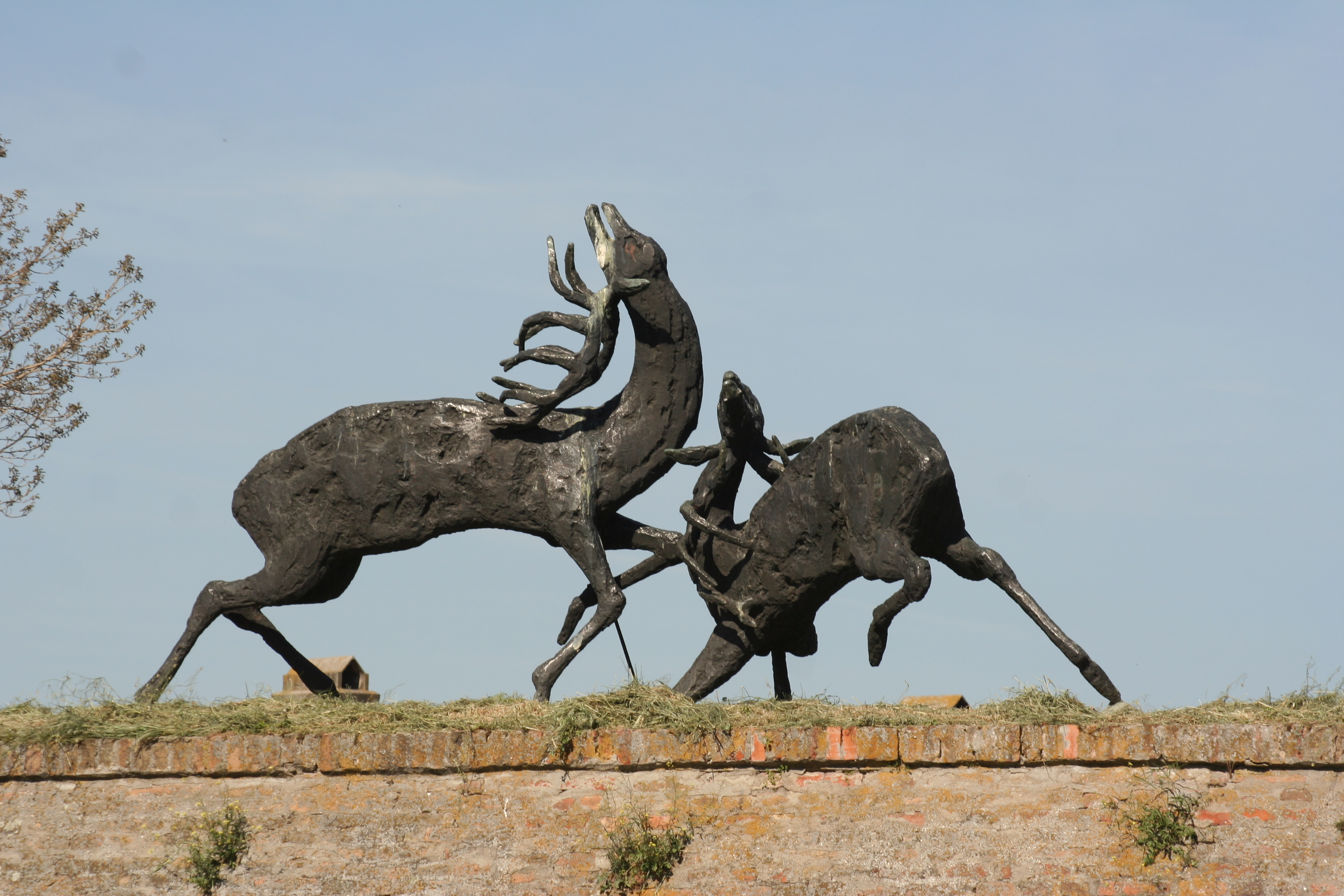
Deer Fighting, Petrovaradin Fortress, Novi Sad, 1965

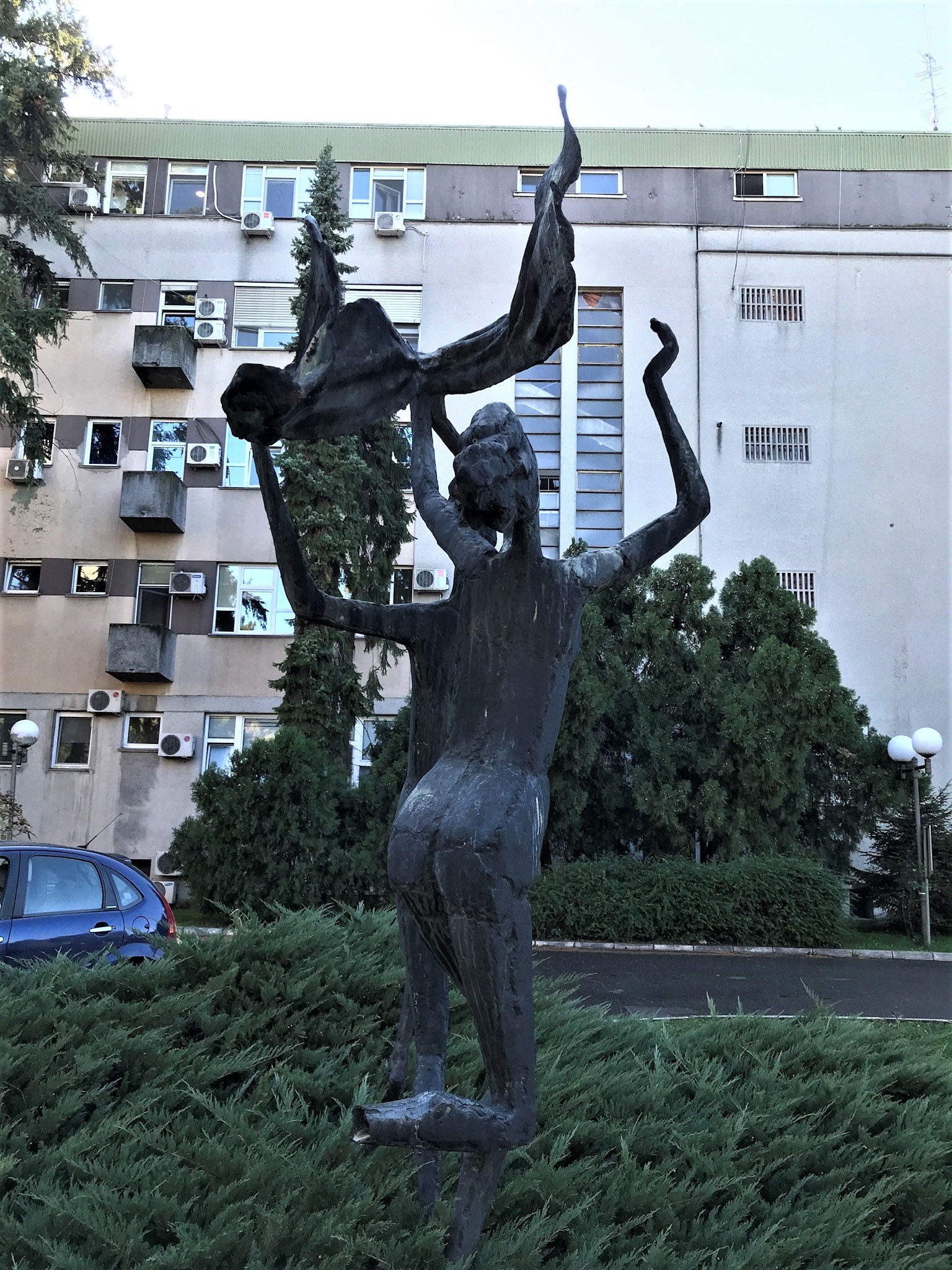
Play, Institute for Oncology of Vojvodina, Sremska Kamenica

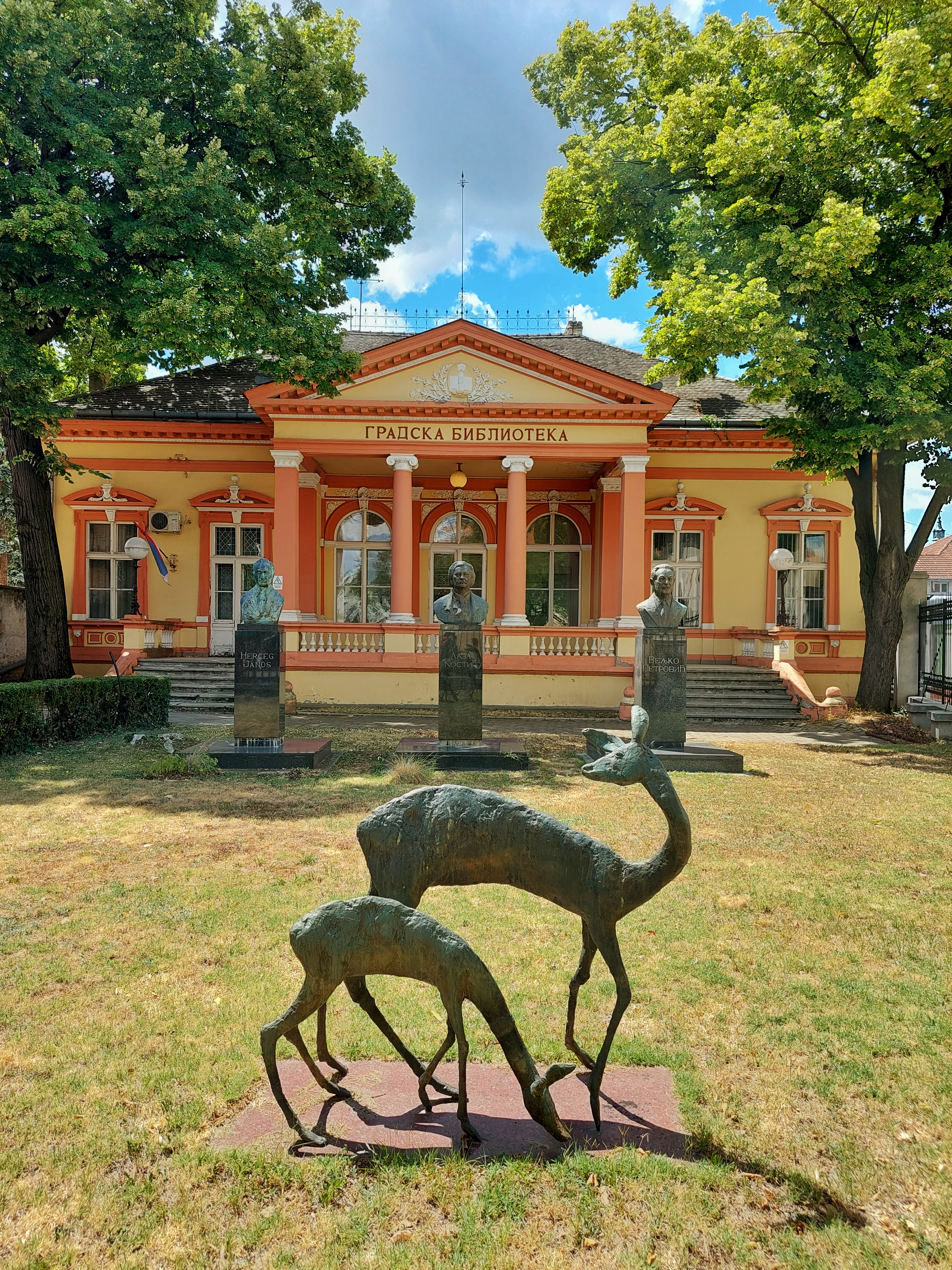
Two chamois, National Library, Sombor

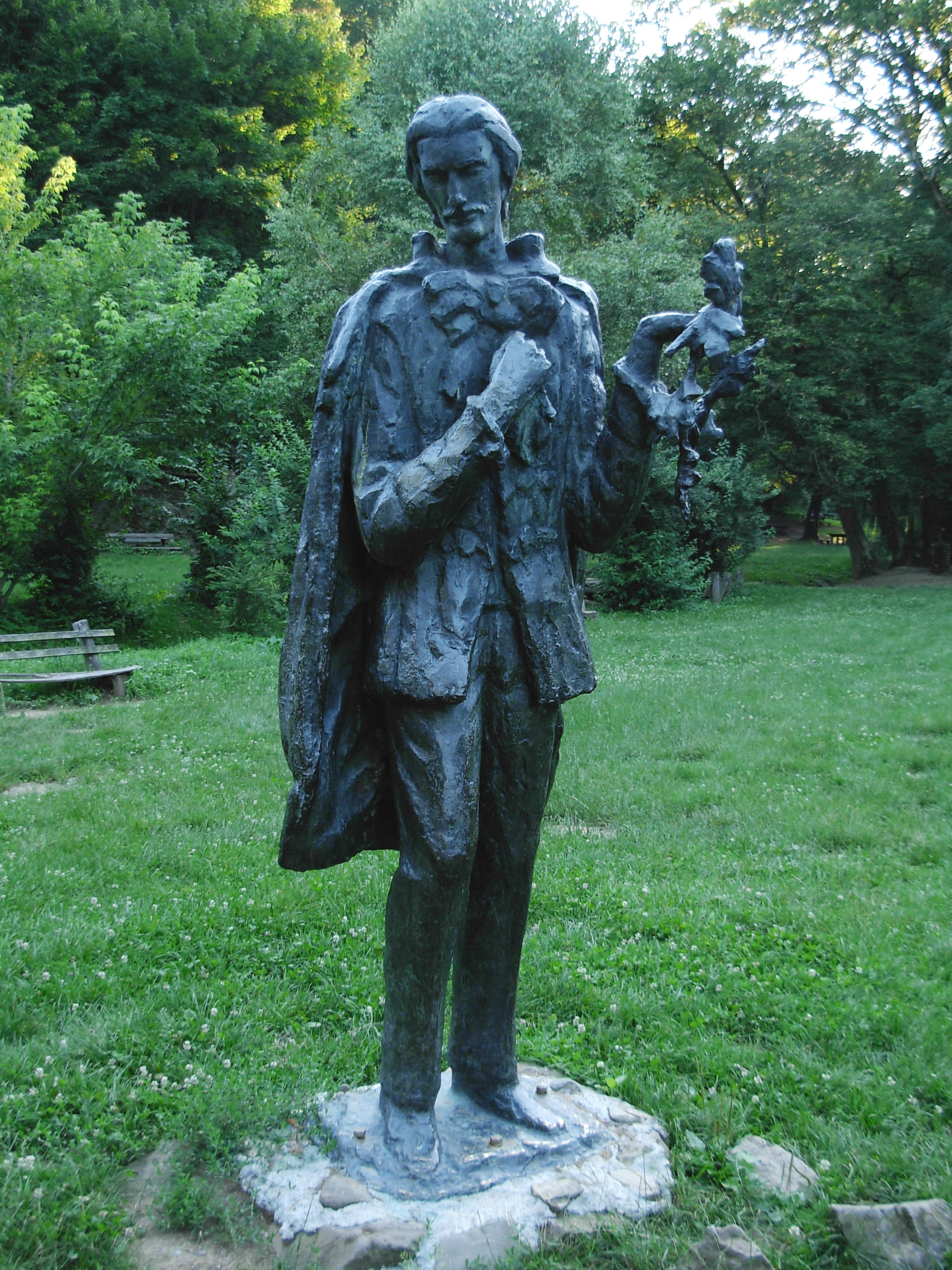
Statue of Branko Radičević, Sremski Karlovci, 1971

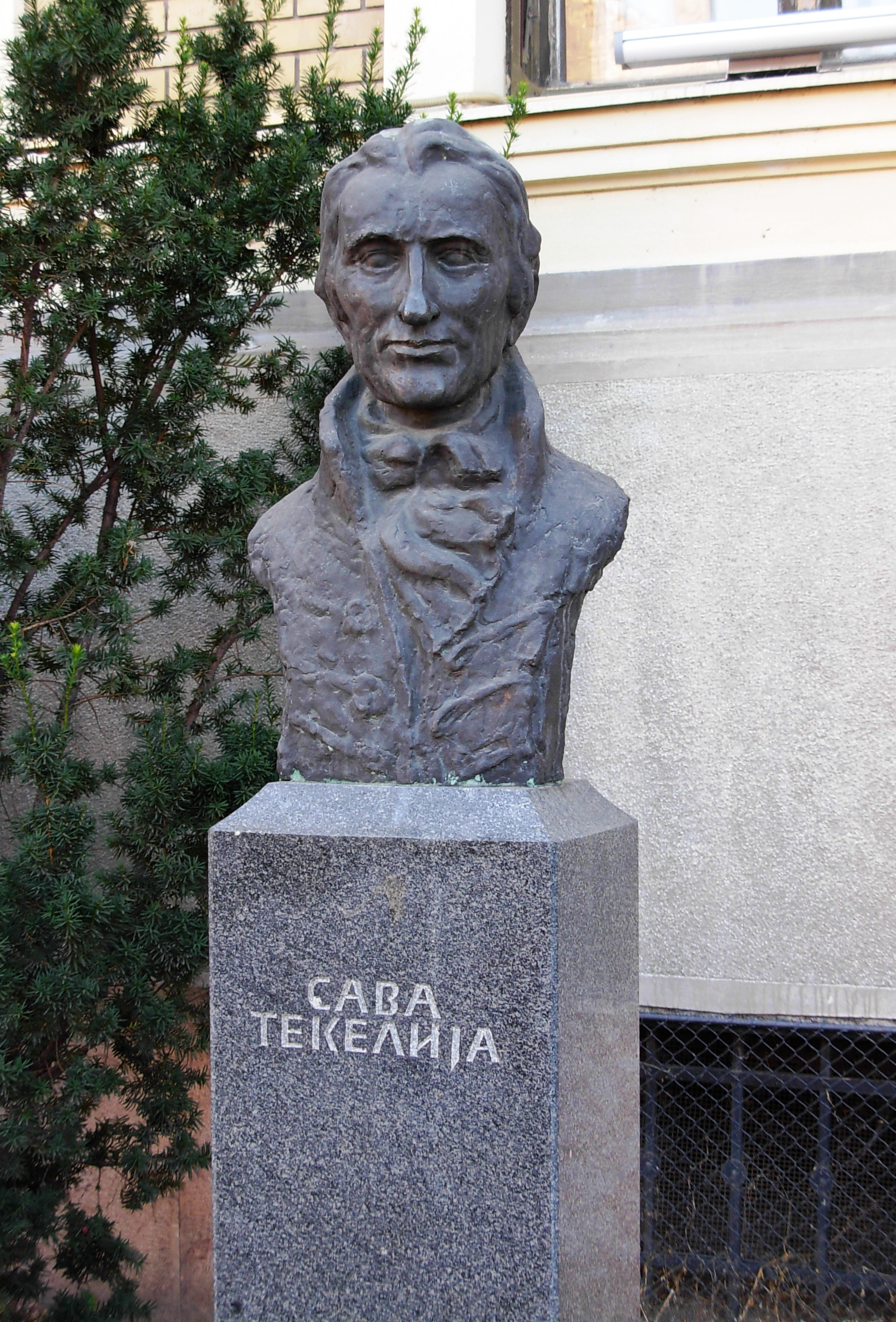
Bust of Sava Tekelija, Matica Srpska, Novi Sad, 1976

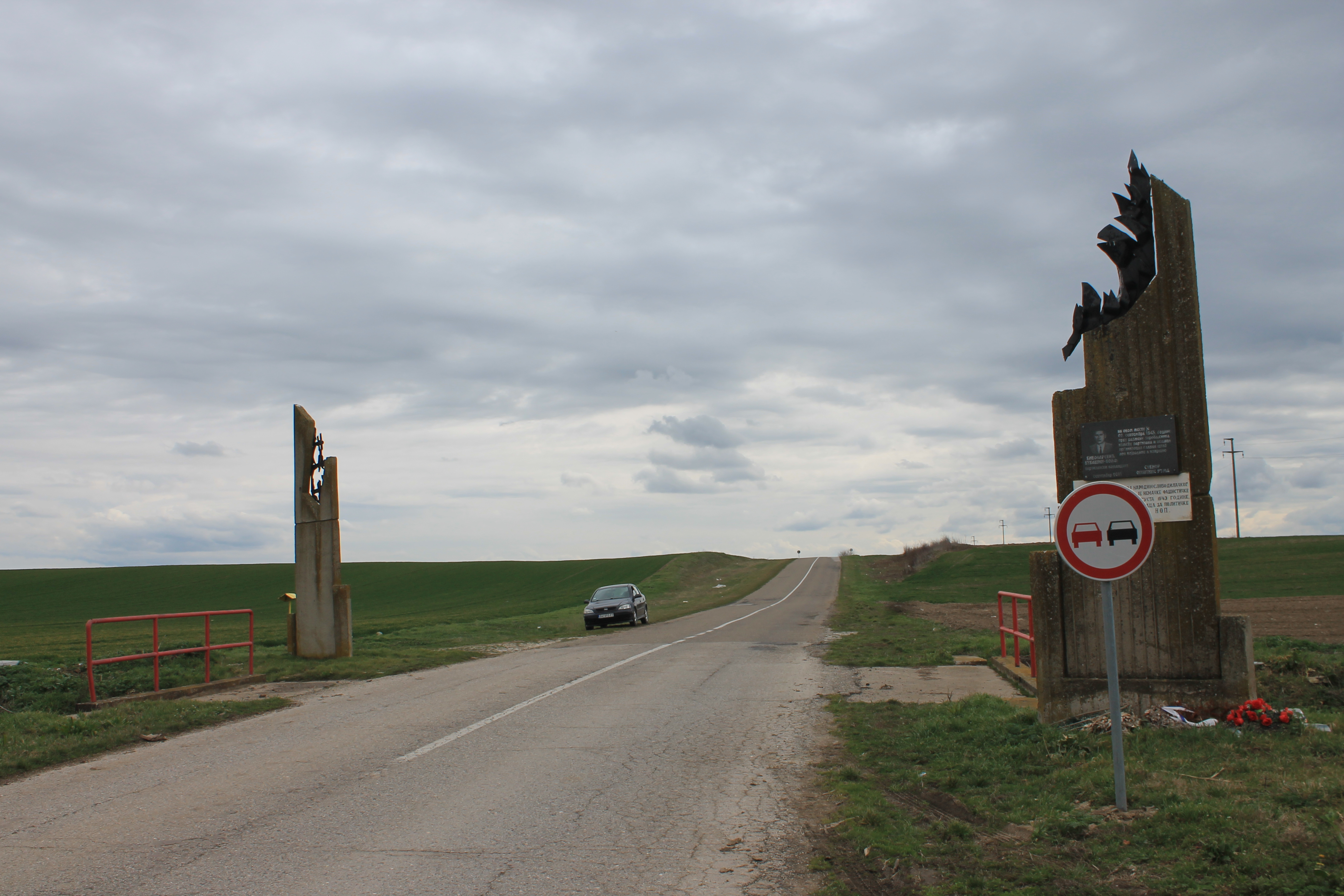
Monument to the National Liberation Struggle, Ruma

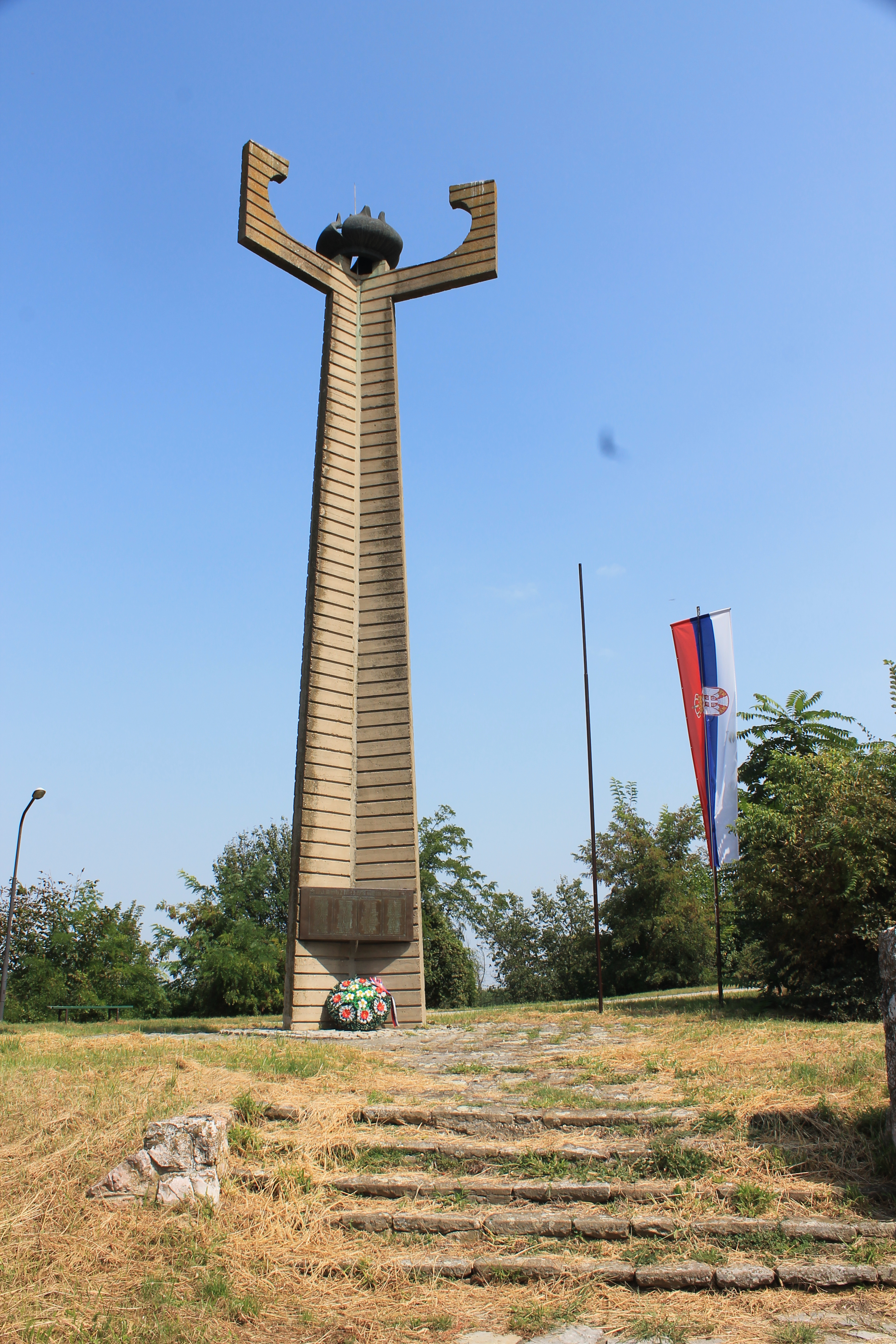
Monument to the National Liberation Struggle, Neštin

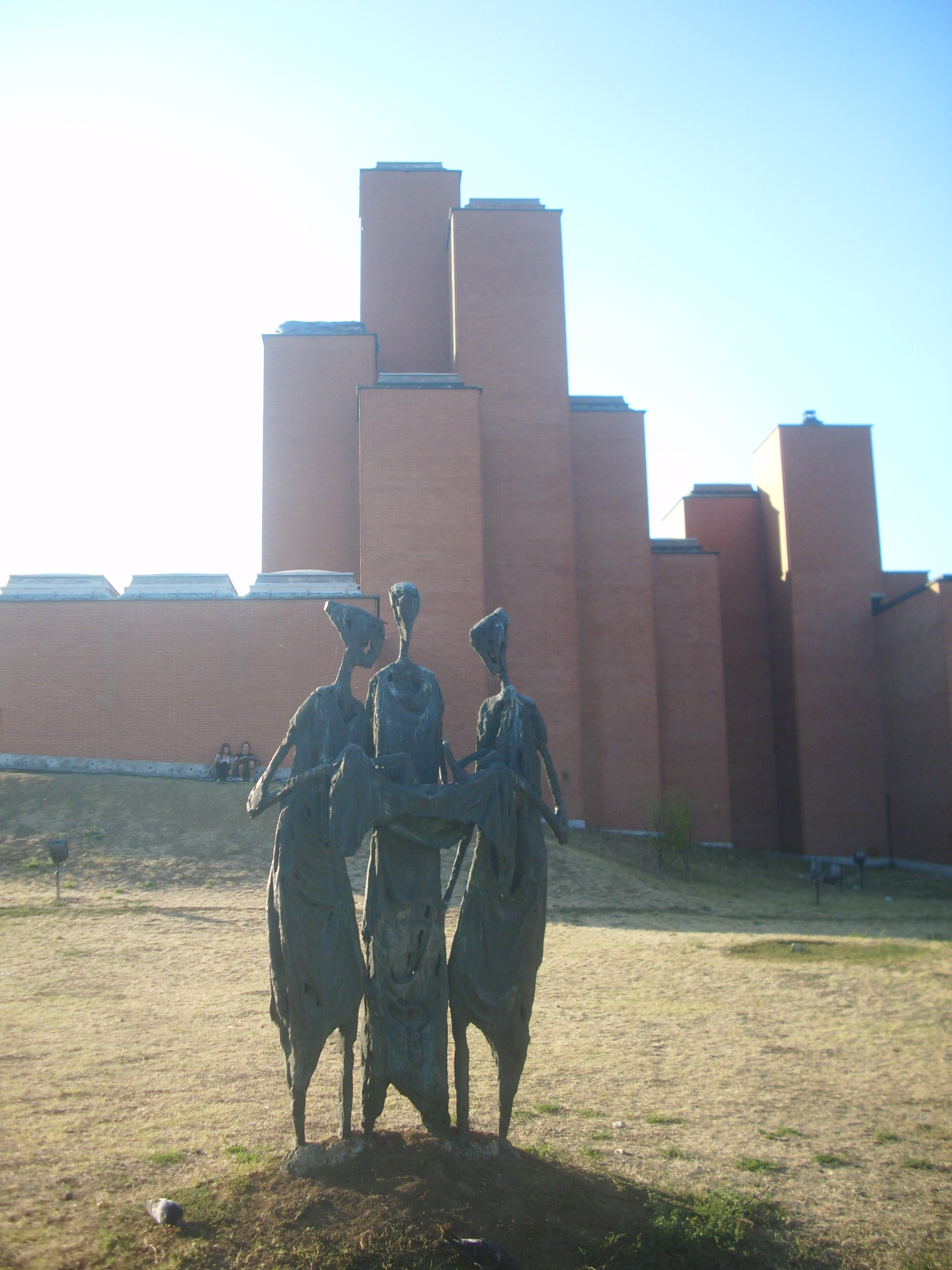
Judges, Šumarice Memorial Park, Kragujevac, 1979

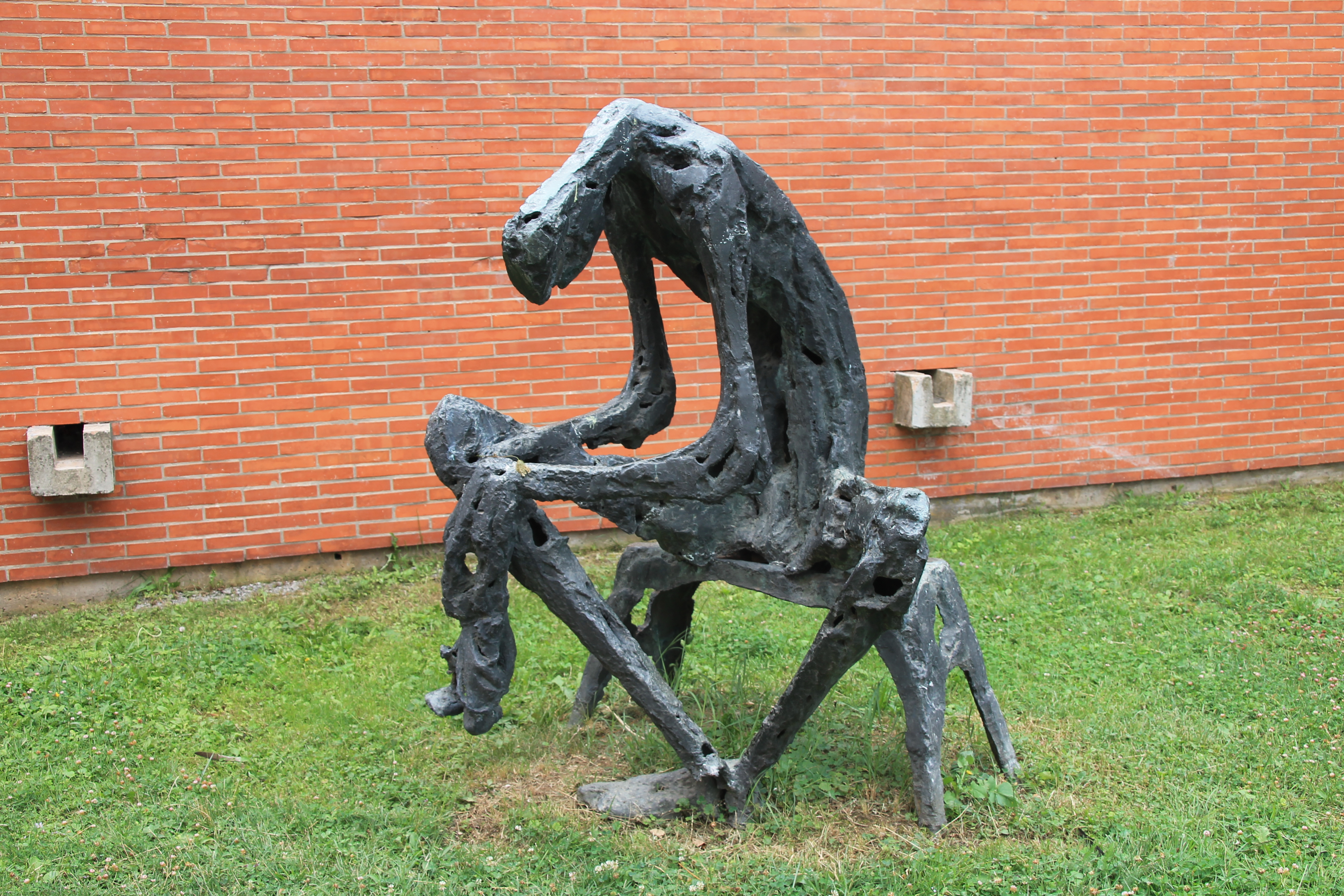
A Man Without Illusions, Kragujevac, 1979

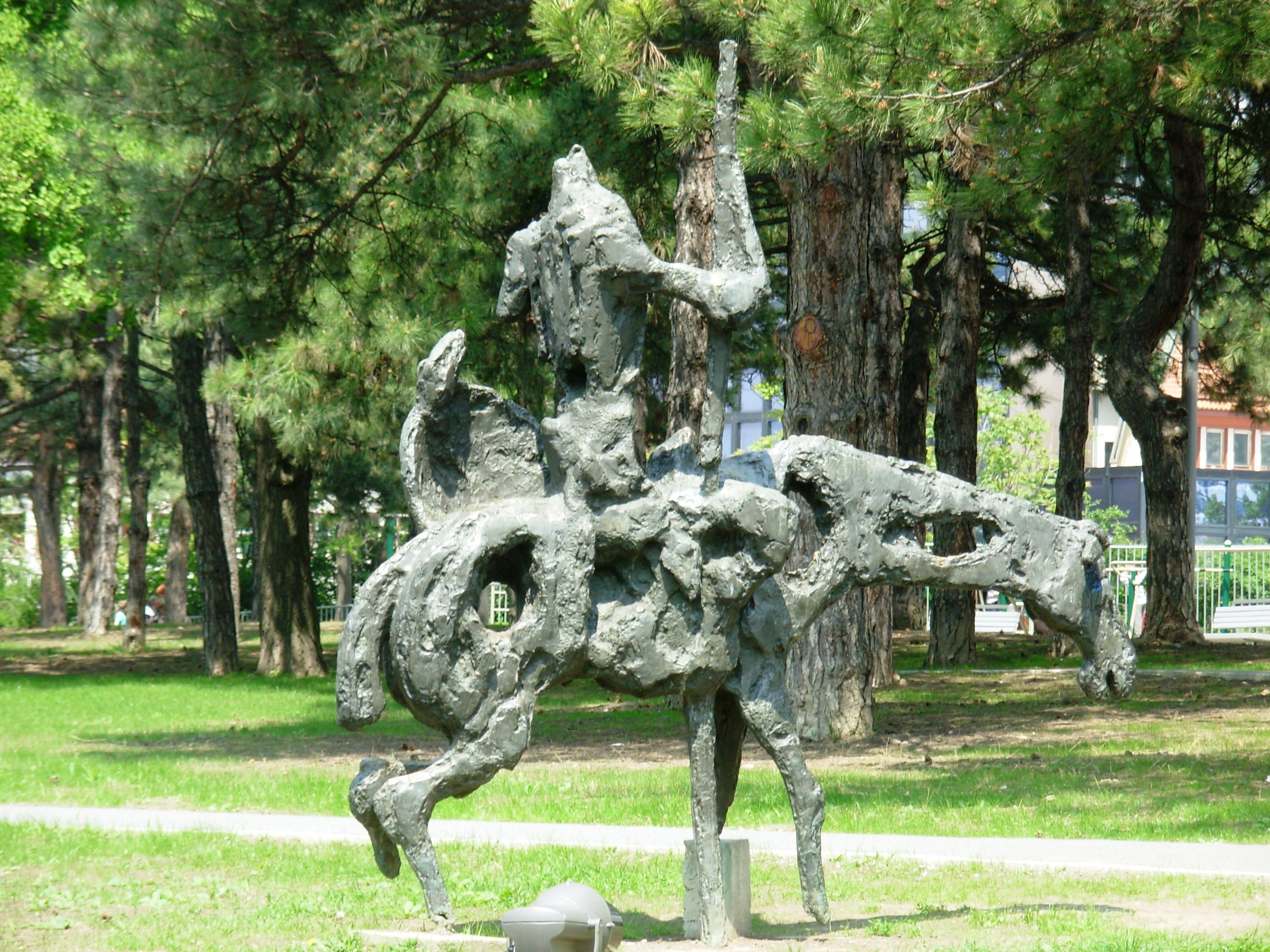
Don Quixote Monument, Tašmajdan Park, Belgrade, 1979

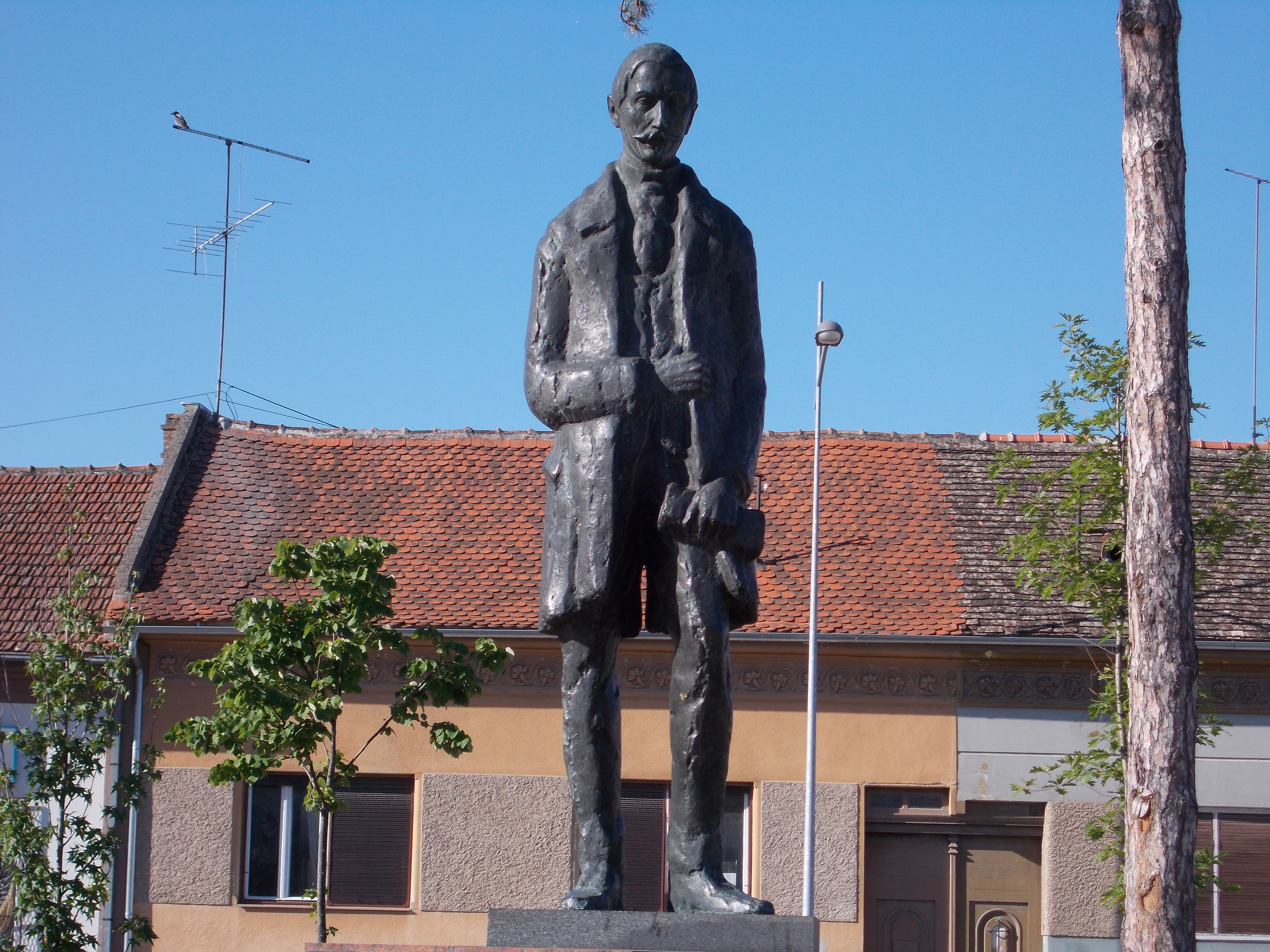
Statue of Jovan Sterija Popović, Vršac, 1981

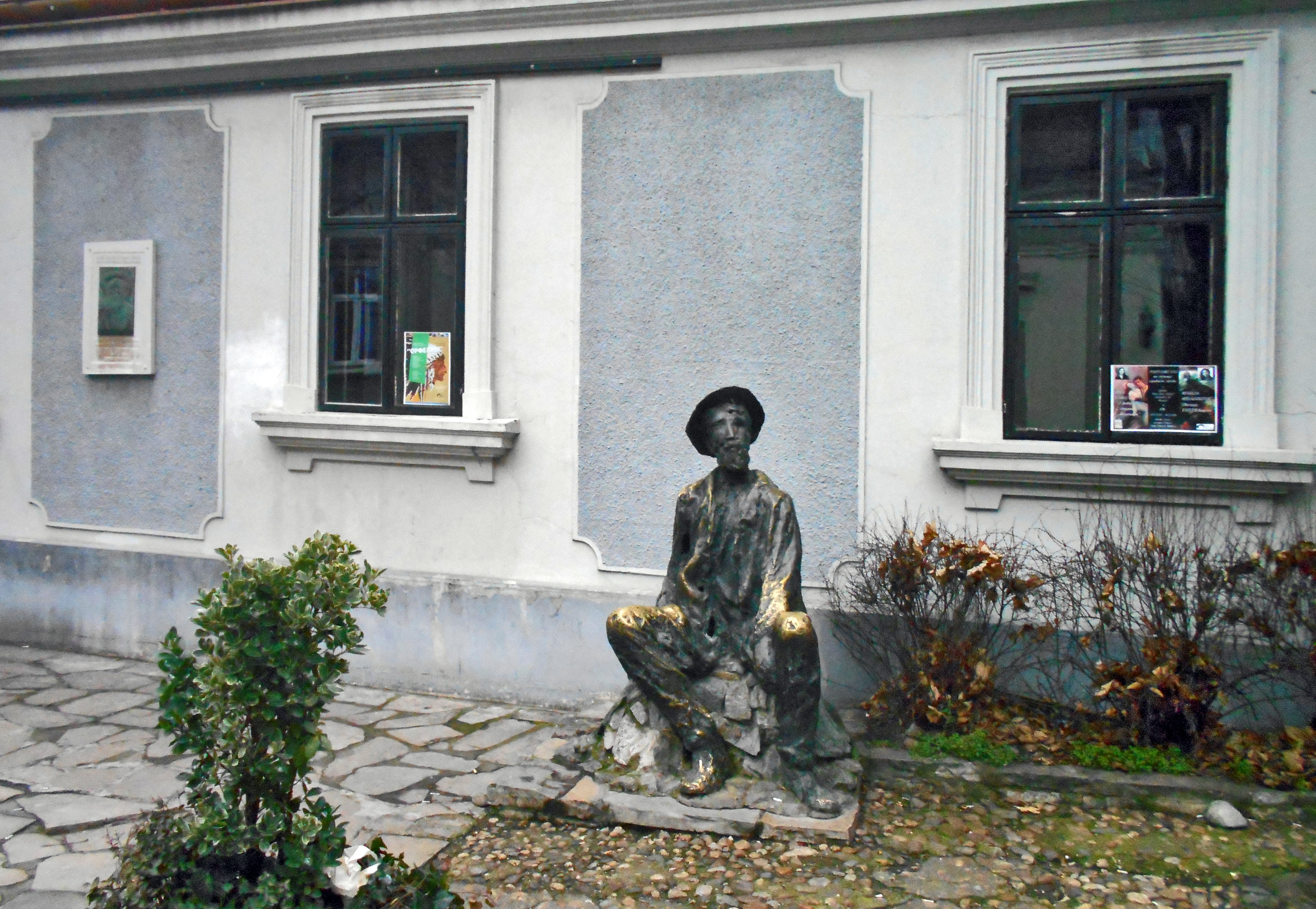
Statue of Đura Jakšić in front of Đura Jakšić´s Home in Skadarlija, Belgrade, 1982

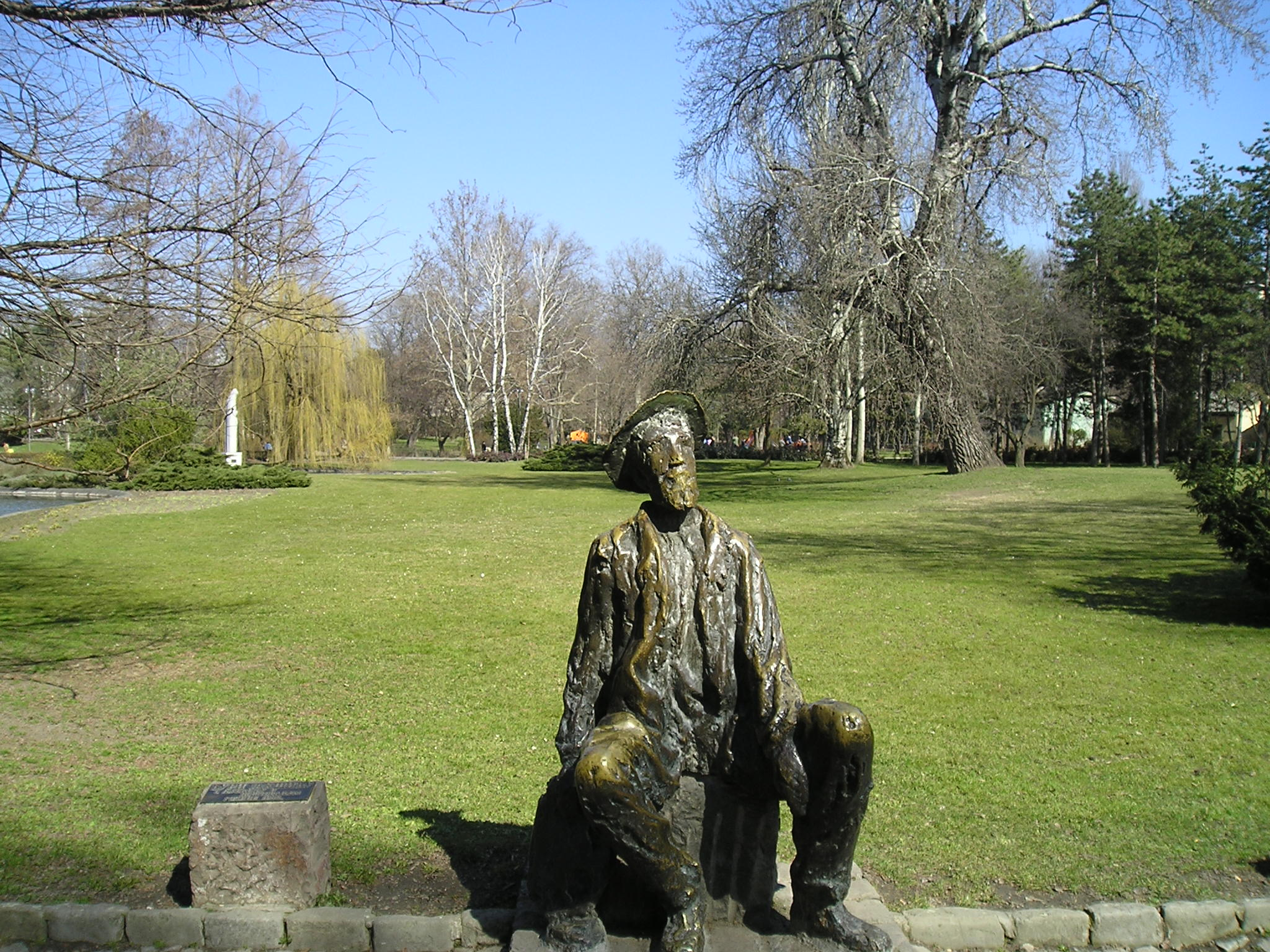
Statue of Đura Jakšić in Danube Park, Novi Sad, 1982

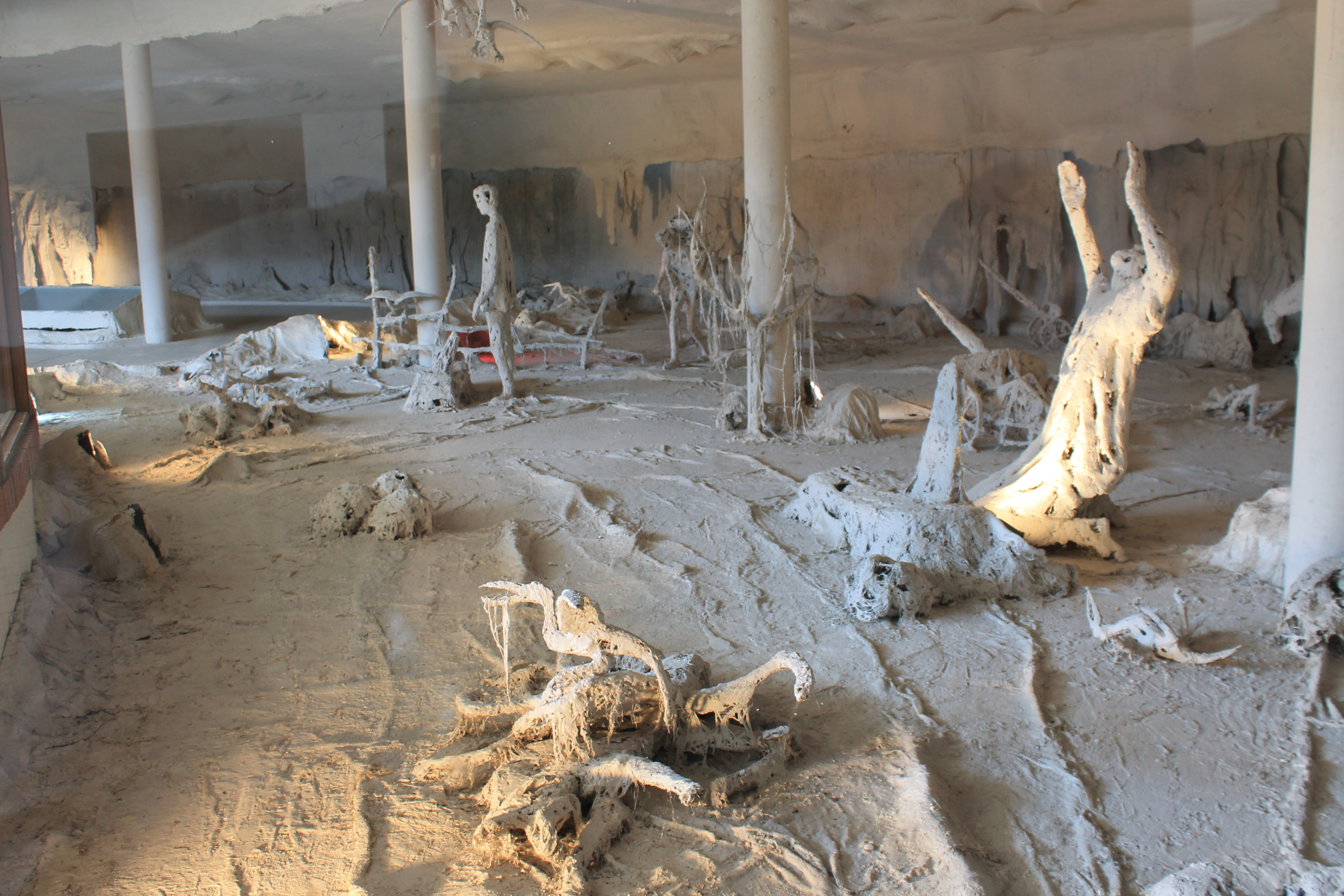
Statues of humans and animals, "Syrmian Front" Memorial Park, Šid, 1987

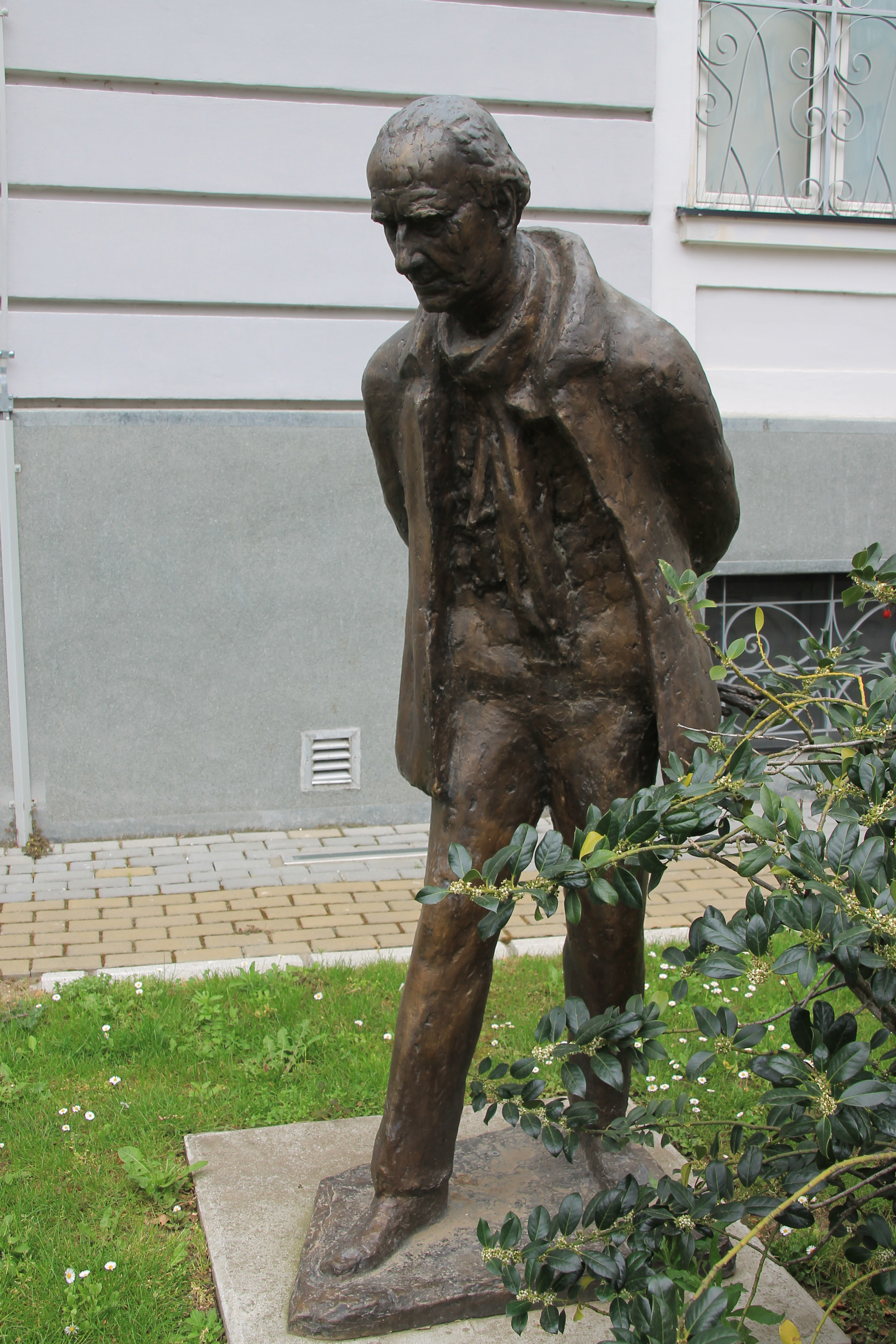
Statue of Milan Konjović, Gallery of Matica Srpska, Novi Sad, 2017 (posthumously)

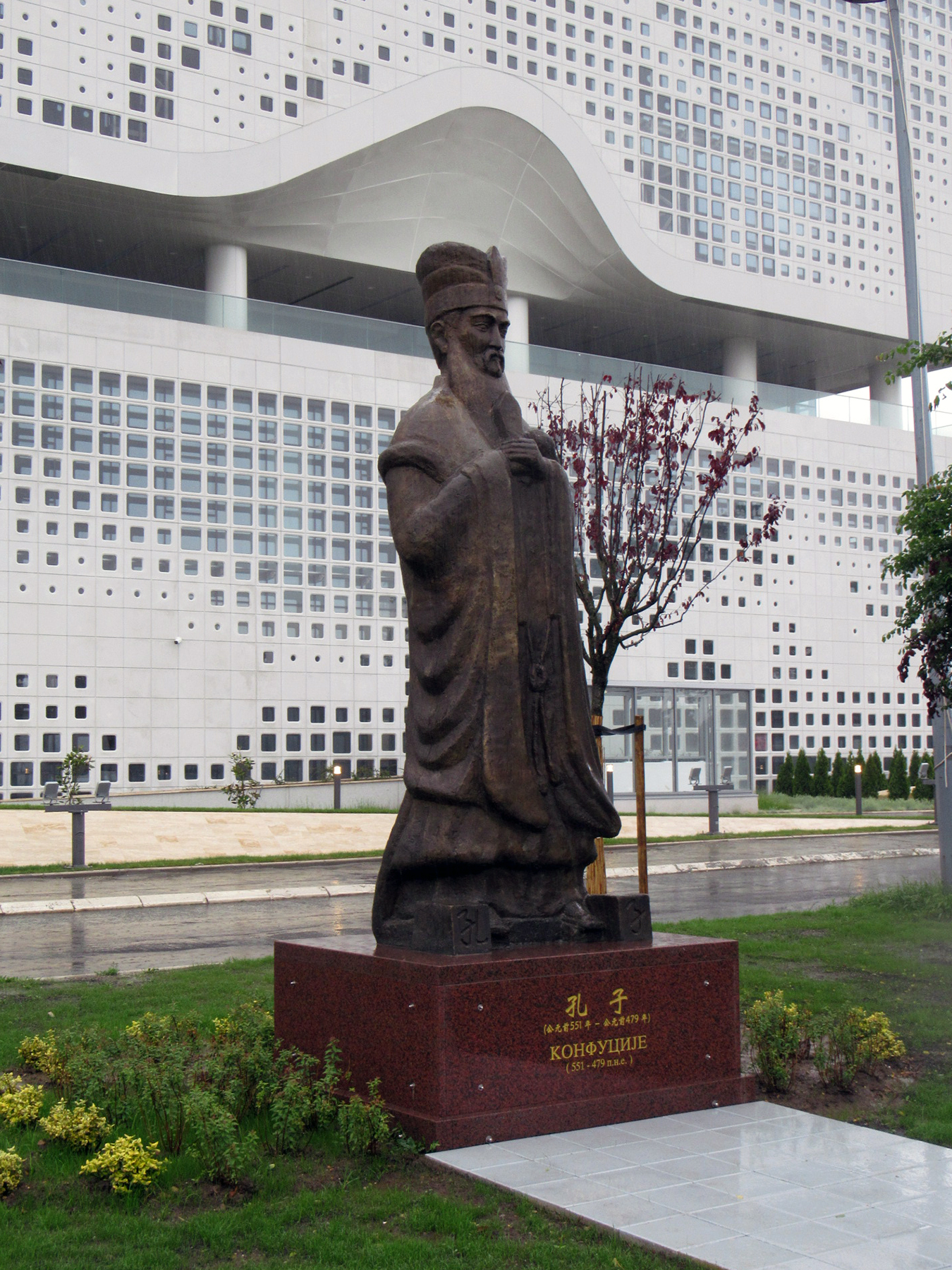
Statue of Confucius, Chinese Cultural Center, Belgrade, 2017 (posthumously)
