= The Gallery of Fine Arts – Gift Collection of Rajko Mamuzić =

Coordinates: 45.2521°N 19.8453°E

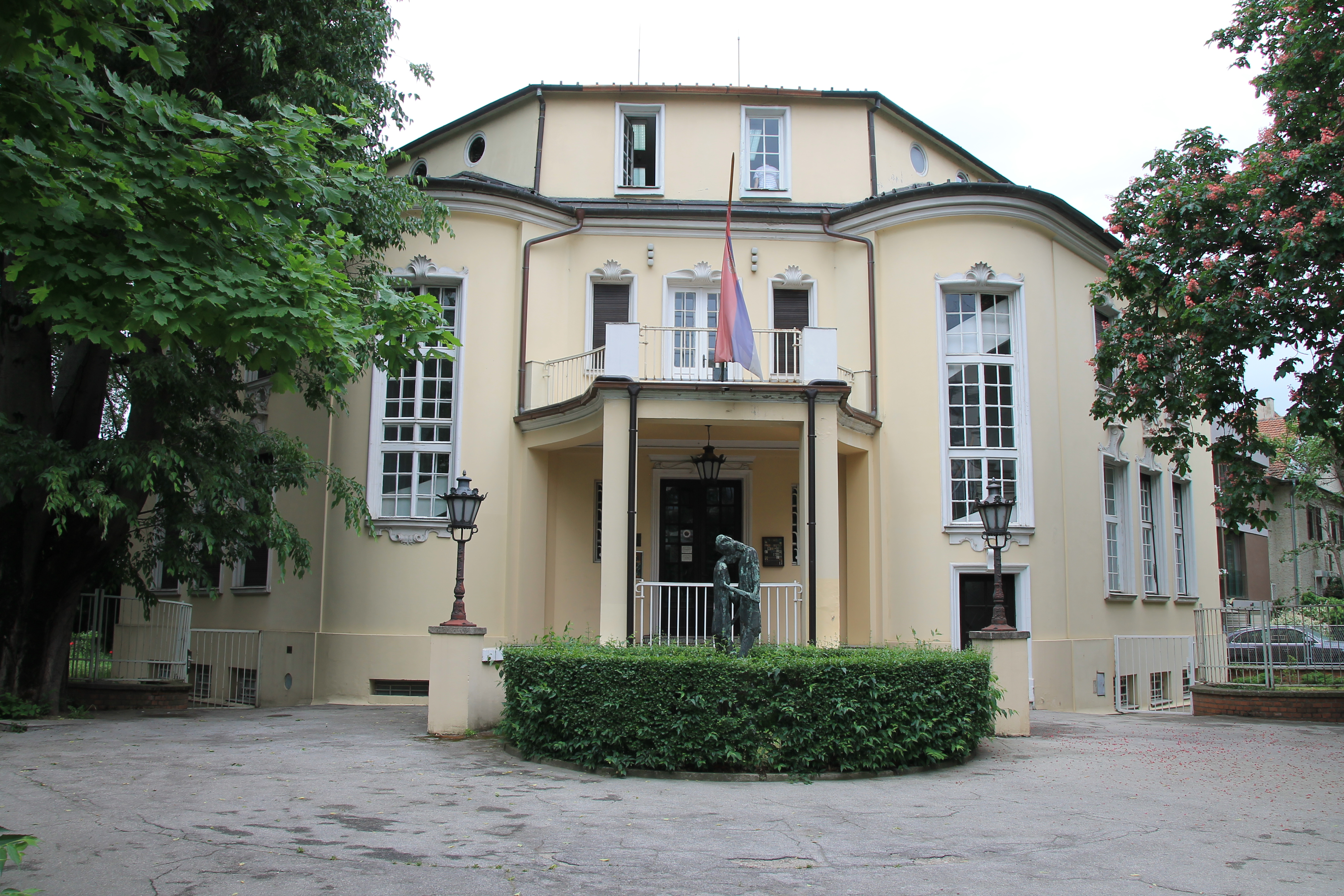
The Gallery of Fine Arts - Gift Collection of Rajko Mamuzić

The Gallery of Fine Arts – Gift Collection of Rajko Mamuzić, which represents a modern museum-gallery type of institution, was founded in 1972 and opened to the public in 1974. It is located in Novi Sad, Serbia, in a building built according to the designs of architect Filip Smith for the Radulović family of Novi Sad.

The basic fund of the Gallery represents an anthology of Serbian fine arts from the second half of the 20th century and it contains over 800 works of art, including paintings, sculptures, and drawings by 35 artists: Danica Antić, Miloš Bajić, Slavoljub Slava Bogojević, Kosara Bokšan, Lazar Vozarević, Lazar Vujaklija, Matija Vuković, Angelina Gatalica, Ksenija Divjak, Aleksandar Zarin, Boža Ilić, Nikola Koka Janković, Ljubinka Jovanović, Olivera Kangrga, Majda Kurnik, Aleksandar Luković - Lukijan, Stevan Maksimović, Mario Maskareli, Milorad Bata Mihailović, Mirjana Koka Mihać, Edo Murtić, Petar Omčikus, Vladeta Petrić, Boško Petrović, Zoran Petrović, Milan Popović, Mića Popović, Milica Ribnikar, Ljubica Cuca Sokić, Jovan Soldatović, Mladen Srbinović, Aleksandar Tomašević, Stojan Ćelić, Branko Filipović - Filo and Dragutin Cigarčić.

Collector and donor Rajko Mamuzić chose the first post-war generation of artists who, having rejected the laws of socialist realism, took the way of liberated art without any prejudices and dogmas. Nowadays, they represent the most prominent names of Serbian modern arts with the seven of them being members of the Serbian Academy of Sciences and Arts (SANU).

The Gallery is organized thematically, including individual and retrospective exhibitions as well as lectures on authors, and seminars on art and concerts.

== See also ==
- List of museums in Serbia
