= Mario Maskareli =

Yugoslav painter (1918–1996)

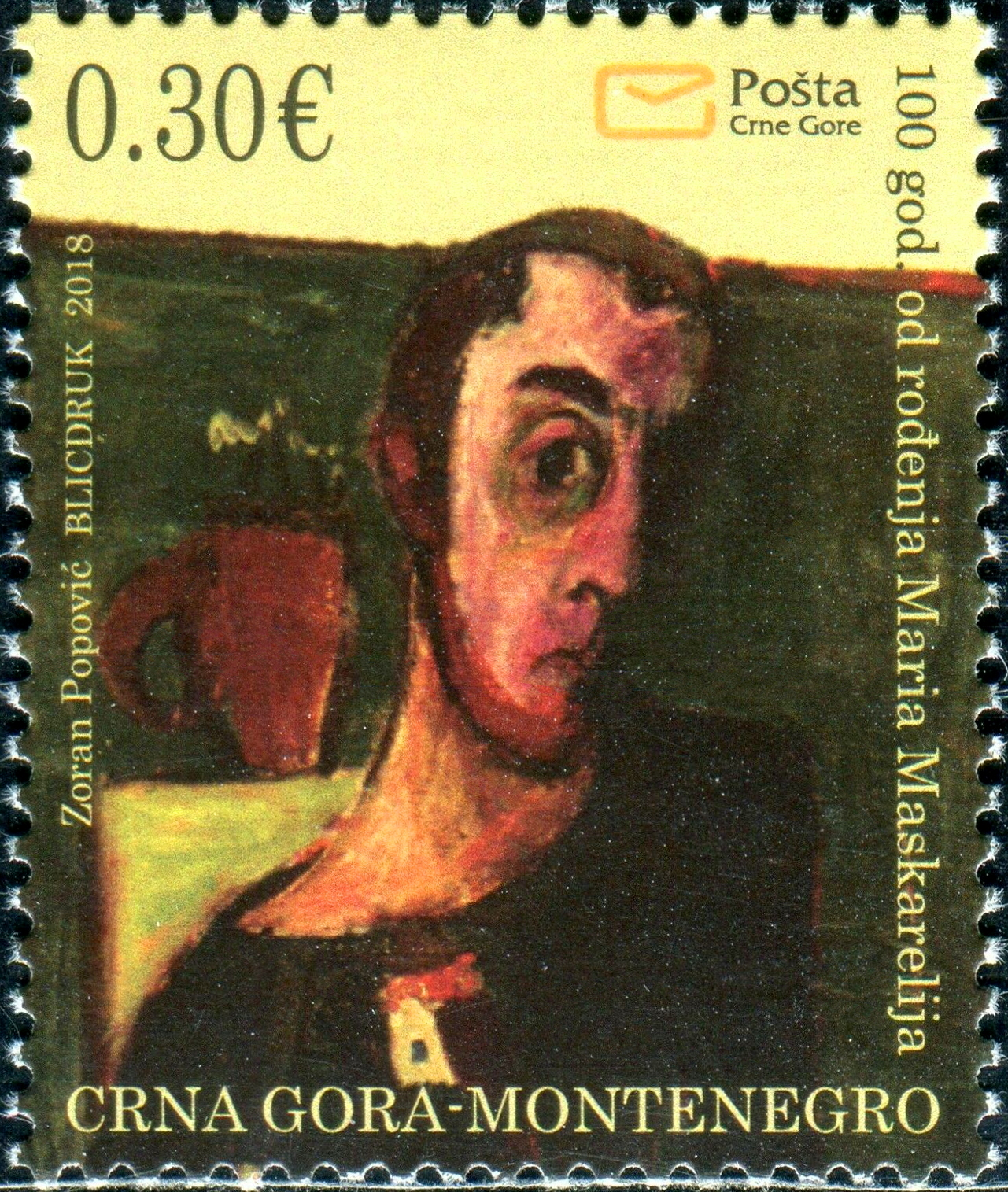
- Self-portrait (1952) on a 2018 stamp of Montenegro
- Born: 20 October 1918; Cetinje, Montenegro
- Died: 26 August 1996 (aged 77); Risan, Federal Republic of Yugoslavia
- Education: Academy of Fine Arts, Belgrade
- Known for: Painting, Drawing, Printmaking, Scenography, Interior Design
- Notable work: Veliko iščekivanje (The Great Expectation) (1953); Ktitor (The Founder) (1957)

Mario Maskareli (Serbian Cyrillic: Марио Маскарели; 20 October 1918 – 26 August 1996) was a painter from modern-day Montenegro.

== Biography ==
Maskareli graduated from the Academy of Fine Arts in Belgrade, Department of Painting in 1951, with Professor Nedeljko Gvozdenović. In 1951 he attended a specialized course in graphic art with Professor Boško Karanović. He spent the academic year 1950/51 teaching at the Applied Arts School in Herceg-Novi.

He was the member of the following groups: Samostalni (The Independent), Beogradska grupa (Belgrade Group) and Lada. He went on study tours to Greece, Italy, France, Belgium and Netherlands.

He exhibited for the first time in 1948. During his artistic career, he was engaged in painting, and graphic art, illustration, scenography, interior design and organization of cultural events.

He won several prizes and awards, among which are the Prize for Painting at the 5th October Salon in Belgrade (1961), the Golden Pen of Belgrade for the illustration of poetry (1973) and the First Prize for Painting at the 14th Winter Salon at Herceg-Novi (1981).

His works can be found in the Museum of Contemporary Art in Belgrade, The Gallery of Fine Arts – Gift Collection of Rajko Mamuzić in Novi Sad, the National Museum of Montenegro at Cetinje and other collections both at home and abroad. He lived and worked in Belgrade and Prčanj.

Painter Bruno Mascarelli is his paternal half-brother. The opera singer and architect Vera Ćirković is his niece.

=== Further reading ===
1. Miodrag Pavlović, Mario i ekspresionisti. Uz slikarsku biografiju Marija Maskarelija (Mario and the Expressionists. A Contribution to the Artistic Biography of Mario Maskareli), Letopis Matice srpske 157, 427, 6, Novi Sad, Jun 1981, 981–920.
2. Petar Petrović, "A Word about the Drawings of Mario Maskareli", in: Mario Maskareli. Crteži (Mario Maskareli. Drawings), KC „Jadran Art", Perast, 2004, [9]-[10].
3. Lidija Merenik, Ljiljana Ćinkul, Draginja Maskareli, Mario Maskareli. Mala retrospektiva: grafike i crteži/Mario Maskareli. A Small Retrospective: Prints and Drawings, Galerija Grafički kolektiv, Beograd, 2005. ISBN 86-7726-010-2
4. Mario Maskareli. Grafike (Mario Maskareli. Engravings), Galerija likovne umetnosti Poklon zbirka Rajka Mamuzića, Novi Sad, 2007. ISBN 978-86-85365-14-0
