= David Šegrt =

Serbian powerlifter (born 1999)

Personal information
- Full name: David Šegrt
- Born: 19 March 1999 (age 27) Novi Sad, Serbia, Federal Republic of Yugoslavia
- Years active: 2022–present

Sport
- Country: Serbia
- Sport: Powerlifting
- Weight class: -90 kg, -100 kg
- Event: Bench Press
Medal record
Representing Serbia
Men's Raw Bench Press
World Championships
Gold medal – first place	2024 IPL Elefsina	100 kg
Silver medal – second place	2025 WPA Lakitelek	100 kg
Gold medal – first place	2026 GPA Lakitelek	100 kg
World Cup
Gold medal – first place	2026 WRPF Lakitelek	100 kg
European Championships
Gold medal – first place	2026 IPL Verona	100 kg
European Cup
Gold medal – first place	2026 WRPF Leskovac	100 kg

David Šegrt (Serbian Cyrillic: Давид Шегрт; born 19 March 1999) is a Serbian powerlifter and two-time world champion in bench press. He won the 2024 IPL World Championship and the 2026 GPA World Championship, and has also claimed multiple national and Balkan titles.

== Early life ==
David Šegrt was born in Novi Sad, Serbia. In his youth he trained in Greco-Roman wrestling, competing at the national level, before transitioning to powerlifting.

== Career ==
=== National competitions ===
Šegrt has won a total of six Serbian national titles, including the IPF Junior National Championship in 2022 in the 93 kg class where he set the junior national bench record with 178 kg, he is also the first Serbian lifter to win three consecutive IPF open titles in that category in 2022, 2023 and 2024.

=== International competitions ===
He is a five-time Balkan champion, with international achievements including gold in the 100 kg class at the 2024 IPL World Championships in Elefsina, Greece, where he set an IPL Serbian national record with a 210 kg lift. At the 2025 WPA World Championships in Lakitelek, Hungary, he won silver in the same weight class and established a new WPA Serbian national record with a 200 kg lift.. In 2026, he consecutively won the WRPF Balkan, European, and World Cups, before winning the IPL European Championships in Verona, Italy. He concluded the year by winning gold in the 100 kg class at the 2026 GPA World Championships in Lakitelek, Hungary.

=== Future goals ===
Šegrt stated in a RTV morning program that his goals include competing at elite events such as the Arnold Classic, IPL Olympia Pro and the WRPF World Championships.
