= Glavica, Sremska Kamenica =

Neighborhood in Serbia

Coordinates: 45.1933°N 19.8475°E

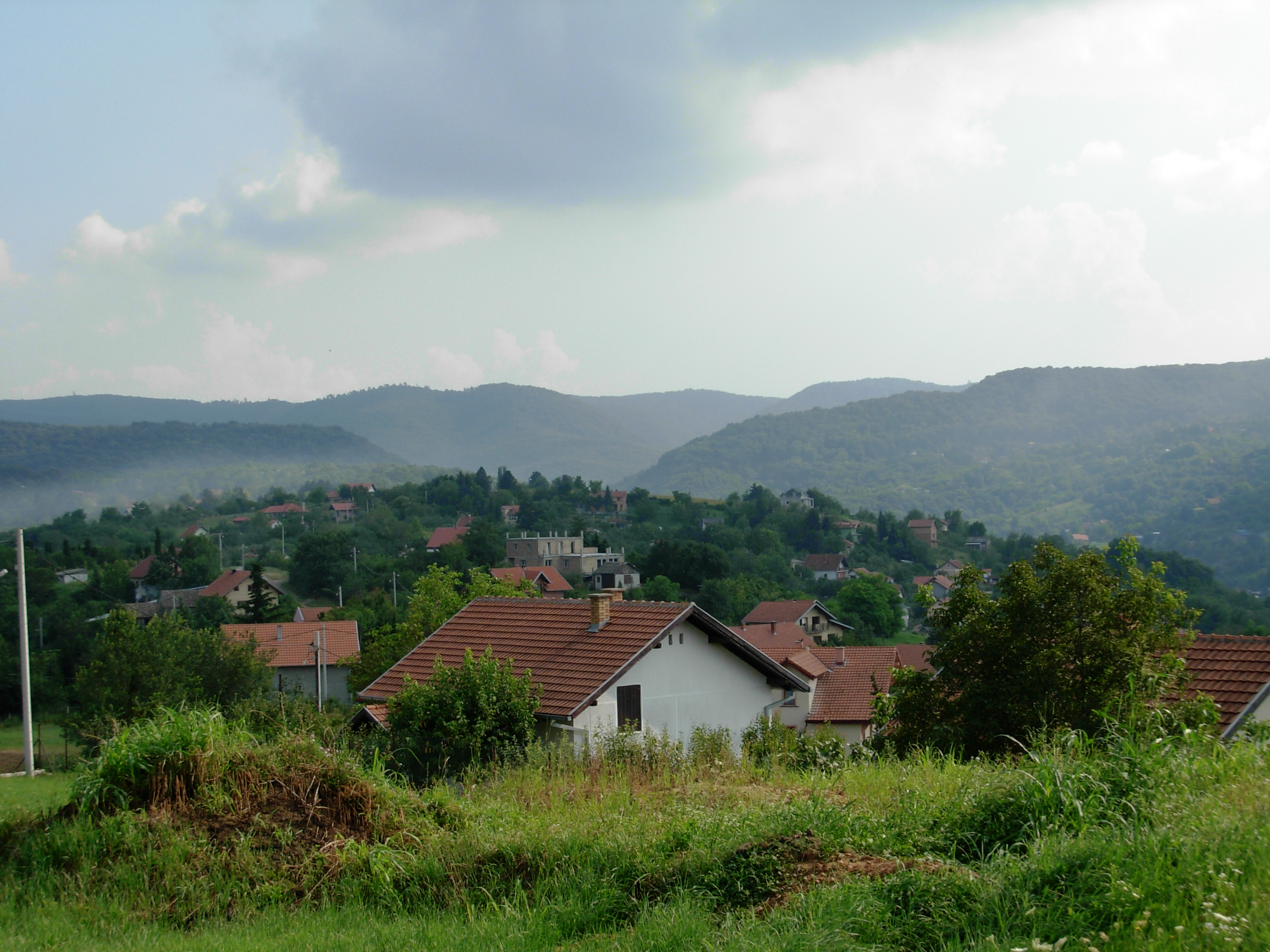
Glavica

Glavica (Cyrillic: Главица) is one of the neighborhoods of Sremska Kamenica, in Serbia. A southern part of Sremska Kamenica, it is about 4 kilometers from the Danube.

It is located outside of Novi Sad urban area, on the edge of Fruška Gora National Park, where it is a popular picnicking area. Glavica is an actual hill, with elevation of 208 m, situated between Paragovo valley in the west and Artiljevo in the east.

Glavica has an asphalt road from Čardak, but it is not connected to other settlements by a public transport. There is a bus line number 72 from Paragovo, 15 minutes walk to the valley and bus line number 69 from Čardak, which is also nearby.
