= Paragovo =

Hamlet in Novi Sad, Serbia

Coordinates: 45.2014°N 19.8420°E

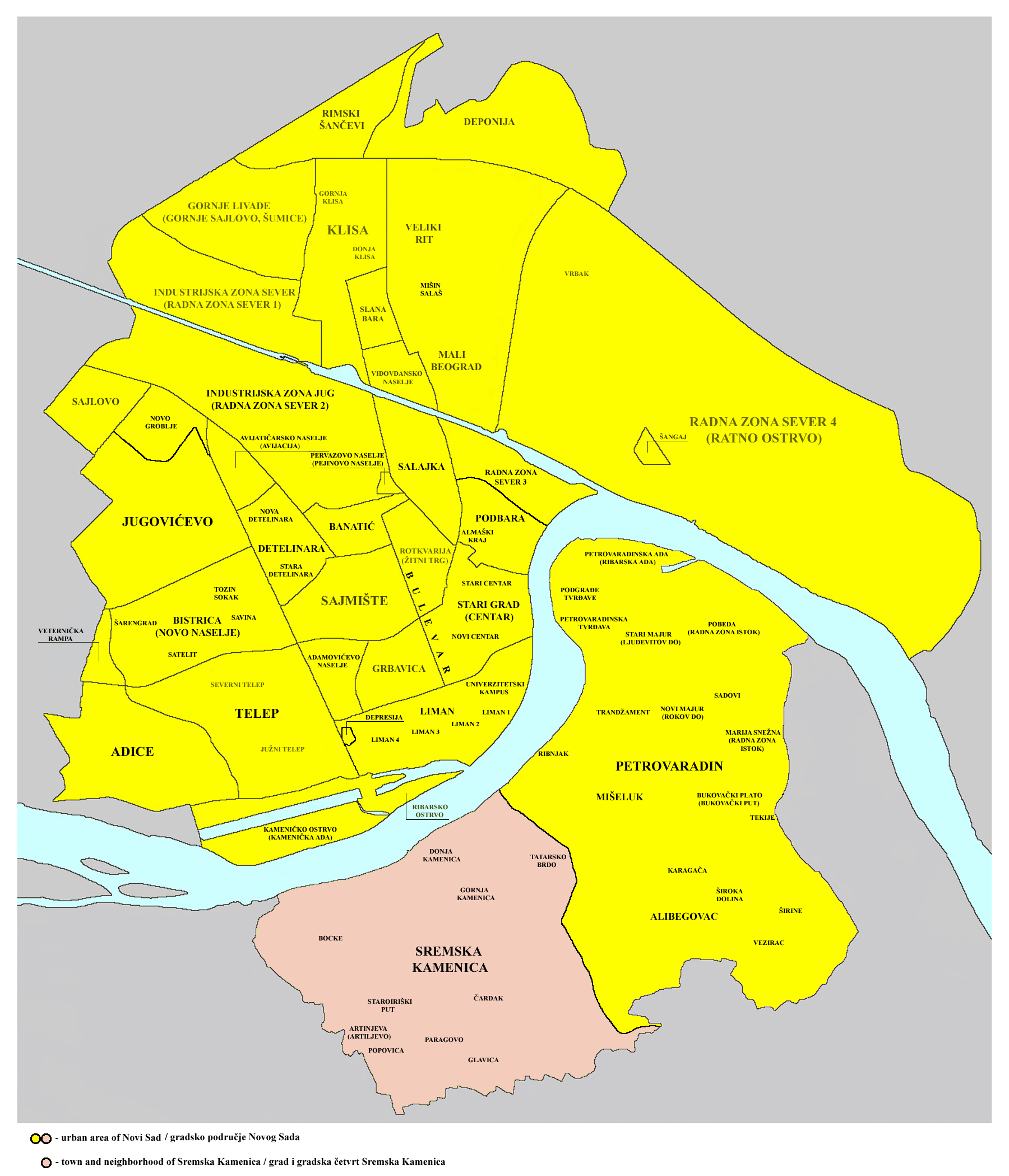
Map of the urban area of Novi Sad with city quarters, showing the location of Paragovo within Sremska Kamenica

Paragovo (Cyrillic: Парагово) is a hamlet in the urban area of Novi Sad and one of the neighborhoods of Sremska Kamenica, in Serbia.

It is located between three hills, Popovica on the west and Glavica and Čardak on the east; at the entrance of Sremska Kamenica, from Ruma and Fruška Gora. Paragovo is connected to Sremska Kamenica and Novi Sad by bus line No.72.

Since the beginning of the 21st century, Paragovo has had a Serbian Orthodox Church. This part of Novi Sad has seen rapid growth during the 1990s, when many people from Croatia and Bosnia and Herzegovina came into Novi Sad. Today, Paragovo has approximately 300 to 500 inhabitants.
