= Bocke =

Coordinates: 45°13′00″N 19°49′15″E

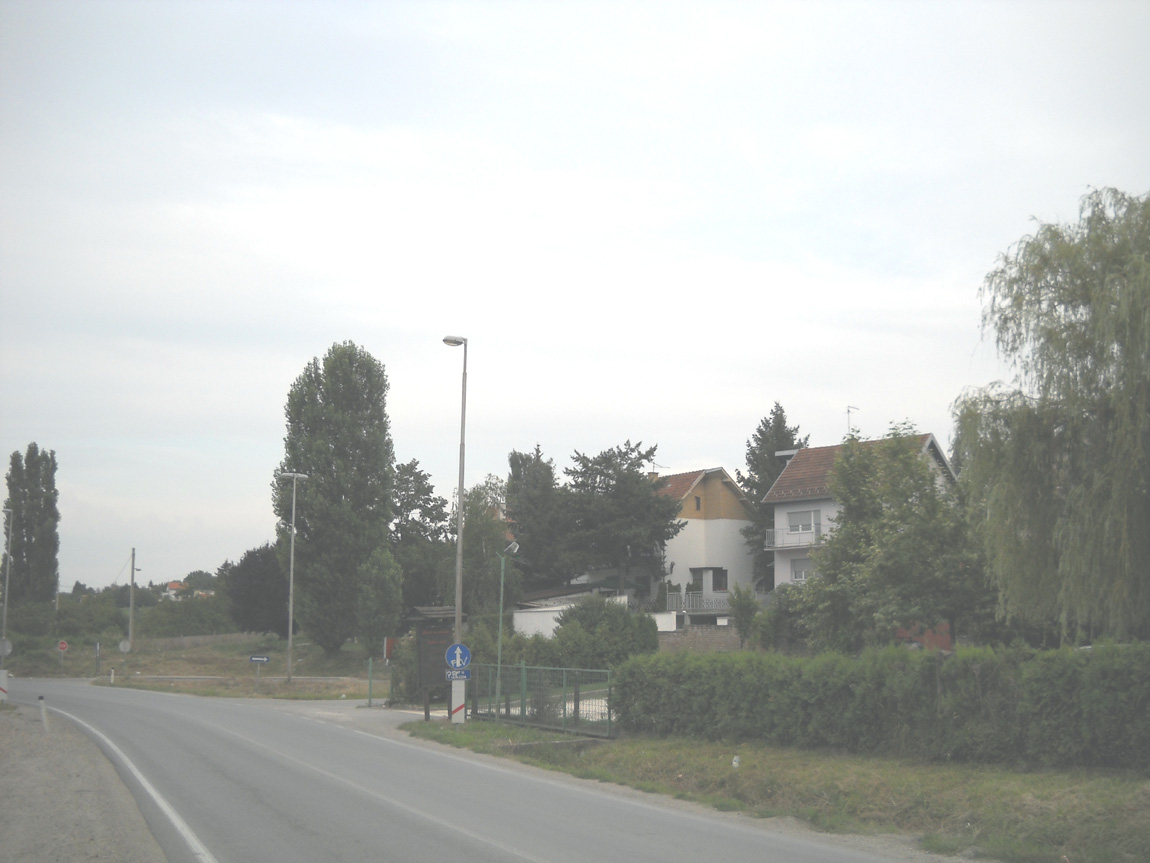
Bocke

Bocke (Serbian: Боцке) is a neighborhood of the city of Novi Sad in Serbia.

== Geography ==
Bocke is the westernmost part of Sremska Kamenica, located along the main road that connects Sremska Kamenica with Beočin. It is located between main part of Sremska Kamenica in the east, Ledinci in the south-west, river Danube in the north, and Popovica in the south-east.

== Traffic ==
Bocke neighborhood is connected to the rest of the city by bus line number 71. Bus lines from number 76 to number 84 also passing through the neighborhood.

== See also ==
- Neighborhoods of Novi Sad
