= Church of the Nativity of the Theotokos, Sremska Kamenica =

Church of the Nativity of the Theotokos
- Црква рођења пресвете Богородице
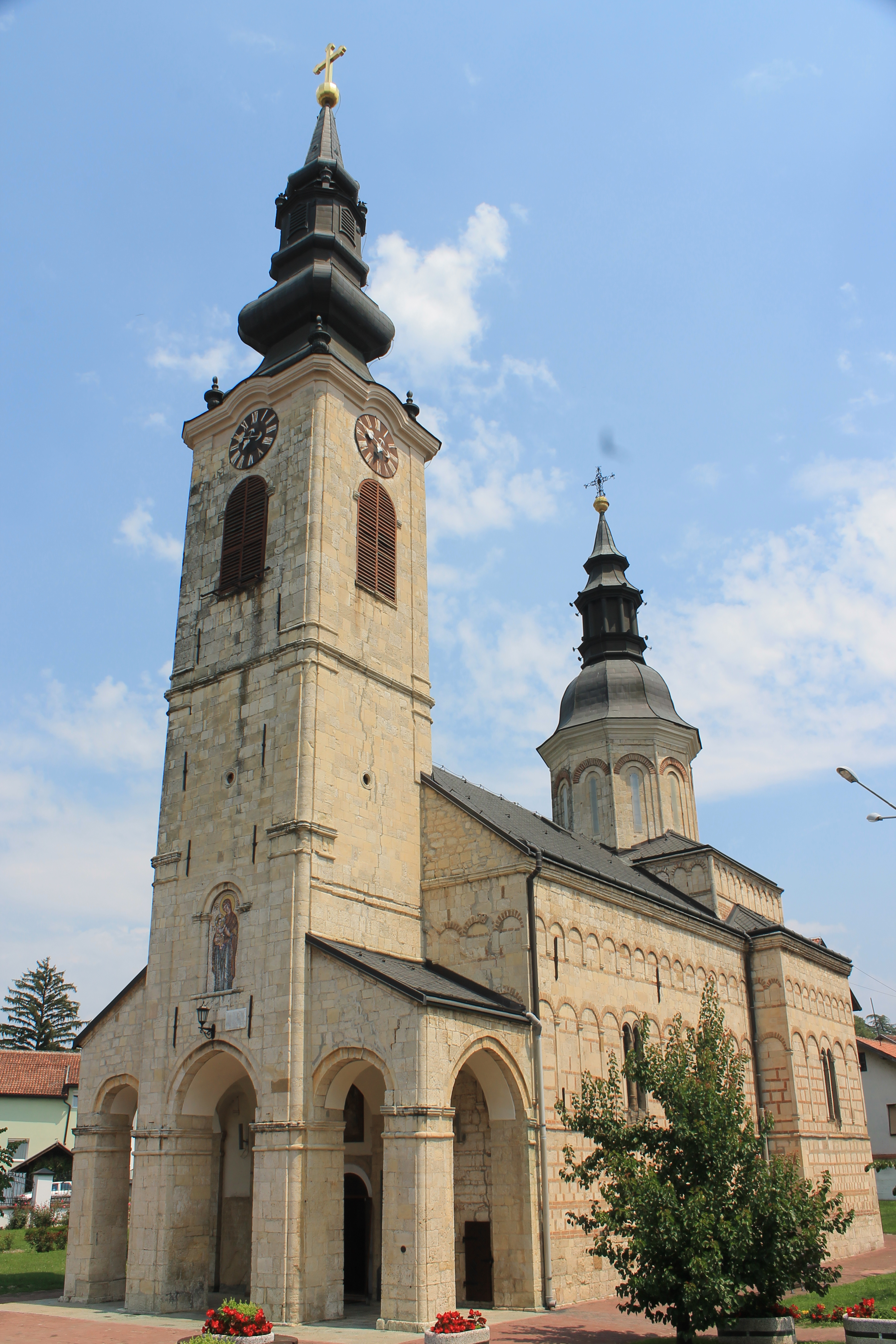
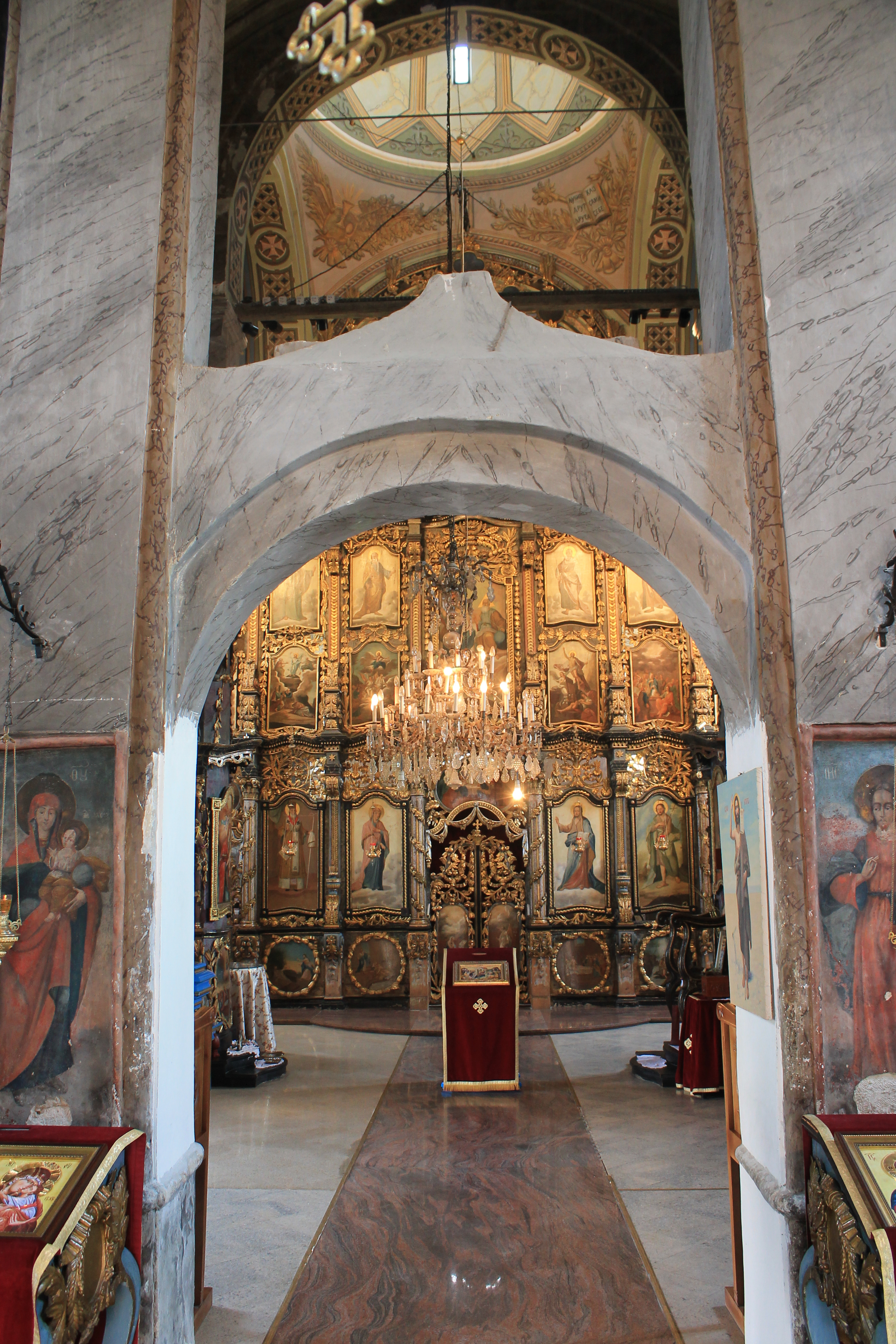
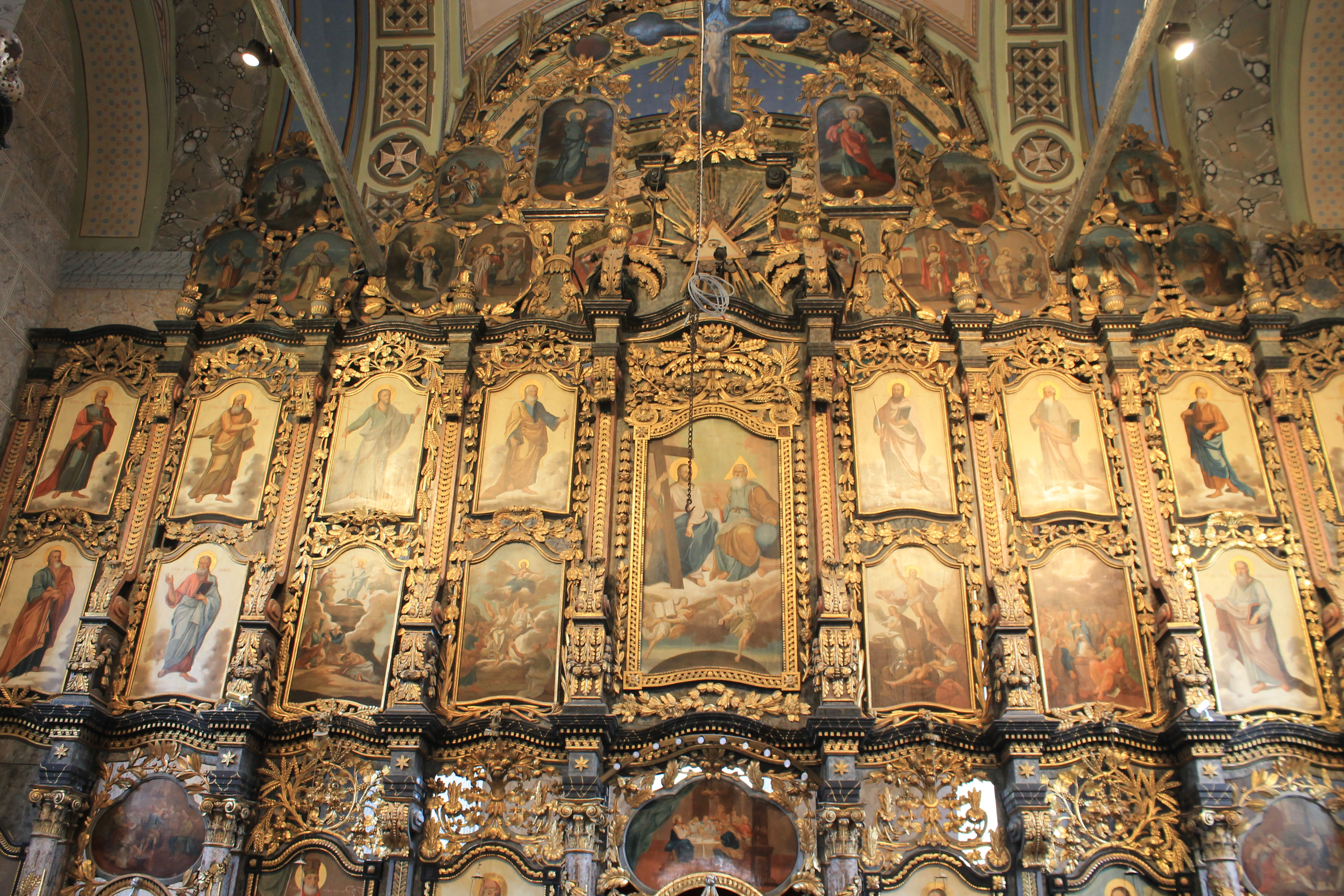
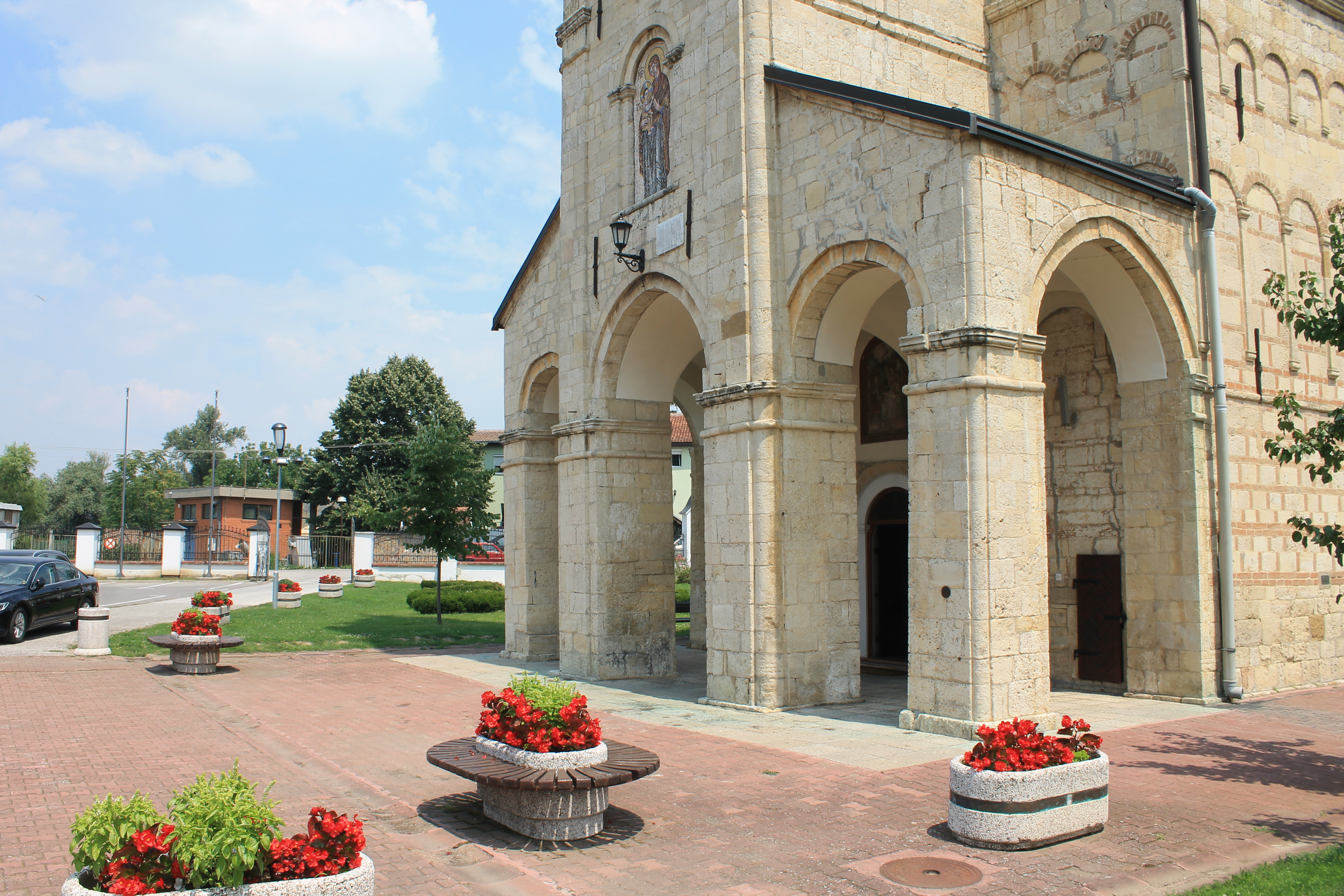
- Church of the Nativity of the Theotokos
- Church of the Nativity of the Theotokos
- 45°13′25″N 19°50′17″E
- Location: Sremska Kamenica, Vojvodina
- Country: Serbia
- Denomination: Serbian Orthodox

History
- Dedication: Nativity of Mary

Architecture
- Years built: 1737-1758

Administration
- Archdiocese: Eparchy of Srem

The Church of the Nativity of the Theotokos (Serbian: Црква рођења пресвете Богородице, romanized: Crkva rođenja presvete Bogorodice) in Sremska Kamenica is a Serbian Orthodox church in Sremska Kamenica, Vojvodina, Serbia. Church is dedicated to Nativity of the Theotokos and was built between 1737 and 1758. The church is a single-nave building with a semi-shaped vault, and rectangular choir areas, large altar apse. The original iconostasis (1753) and frescos (1754) were painted by Jov Vasilijevich and Vasa Ostojić in which they combine traditional Orthodox iconography with Baroque style. The church as protected as a cultural heritage by the authorities of the Autonomous Province of Vojvodina in 1949.

The church is known for the st. Michael icon in front of which conspirators of the 1903 May Coup swore that they will overthrow Alexander I of Serbia.

== See also ==
- Eparchy of Srem
