= Sremska Kamenica =

Sremska Kamenica Сремска Каменица (Serbian)
- Town
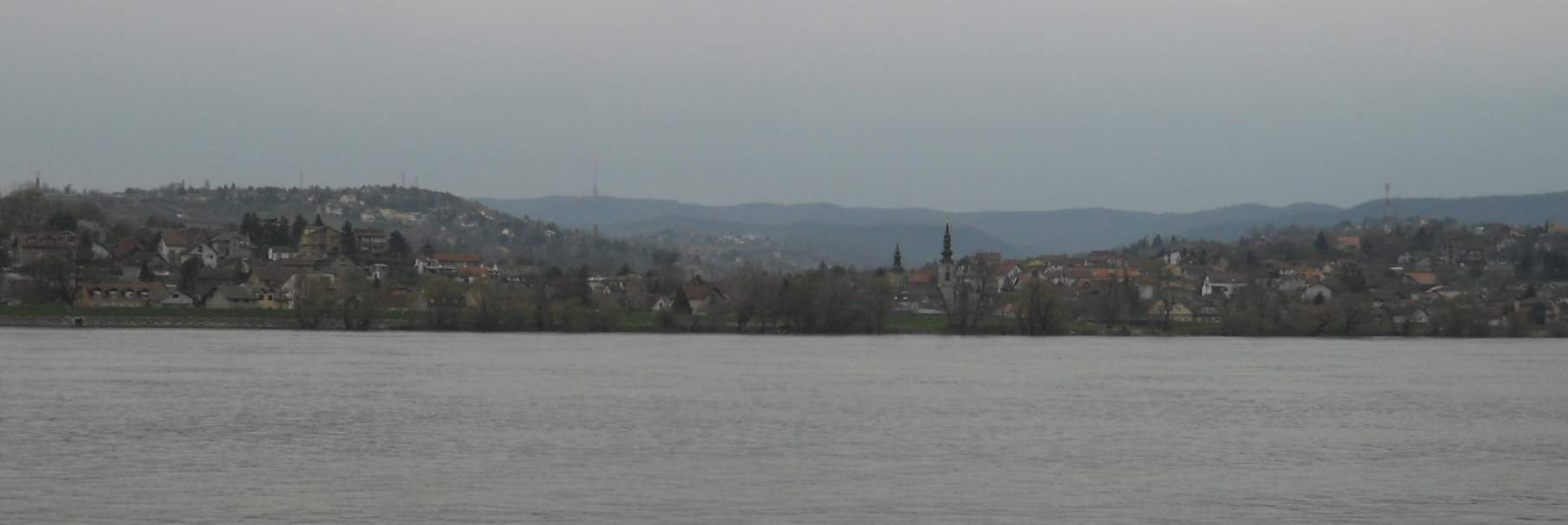
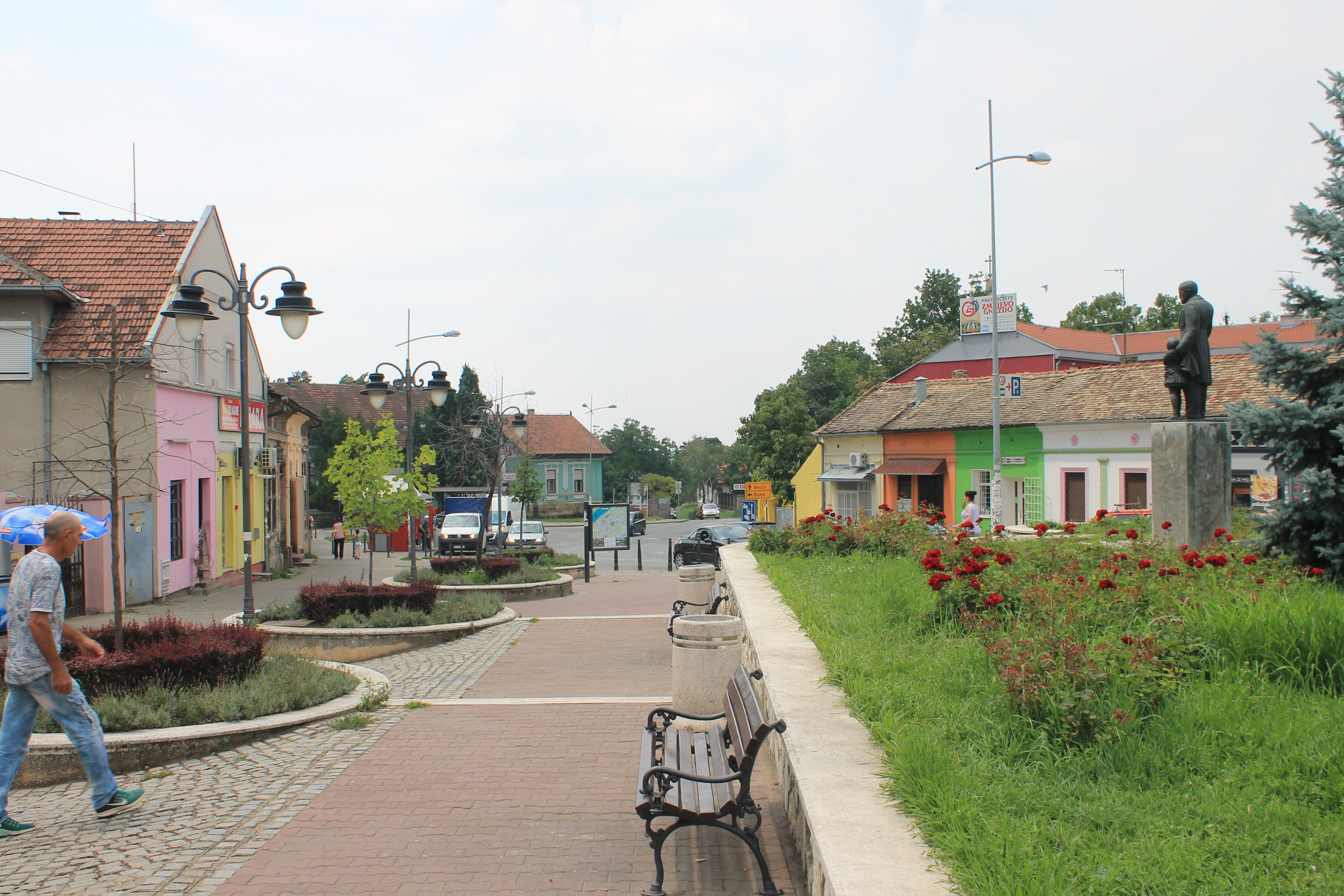
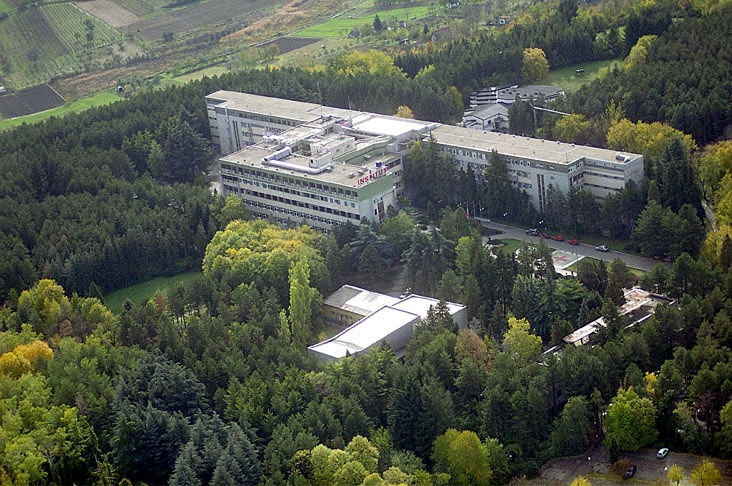
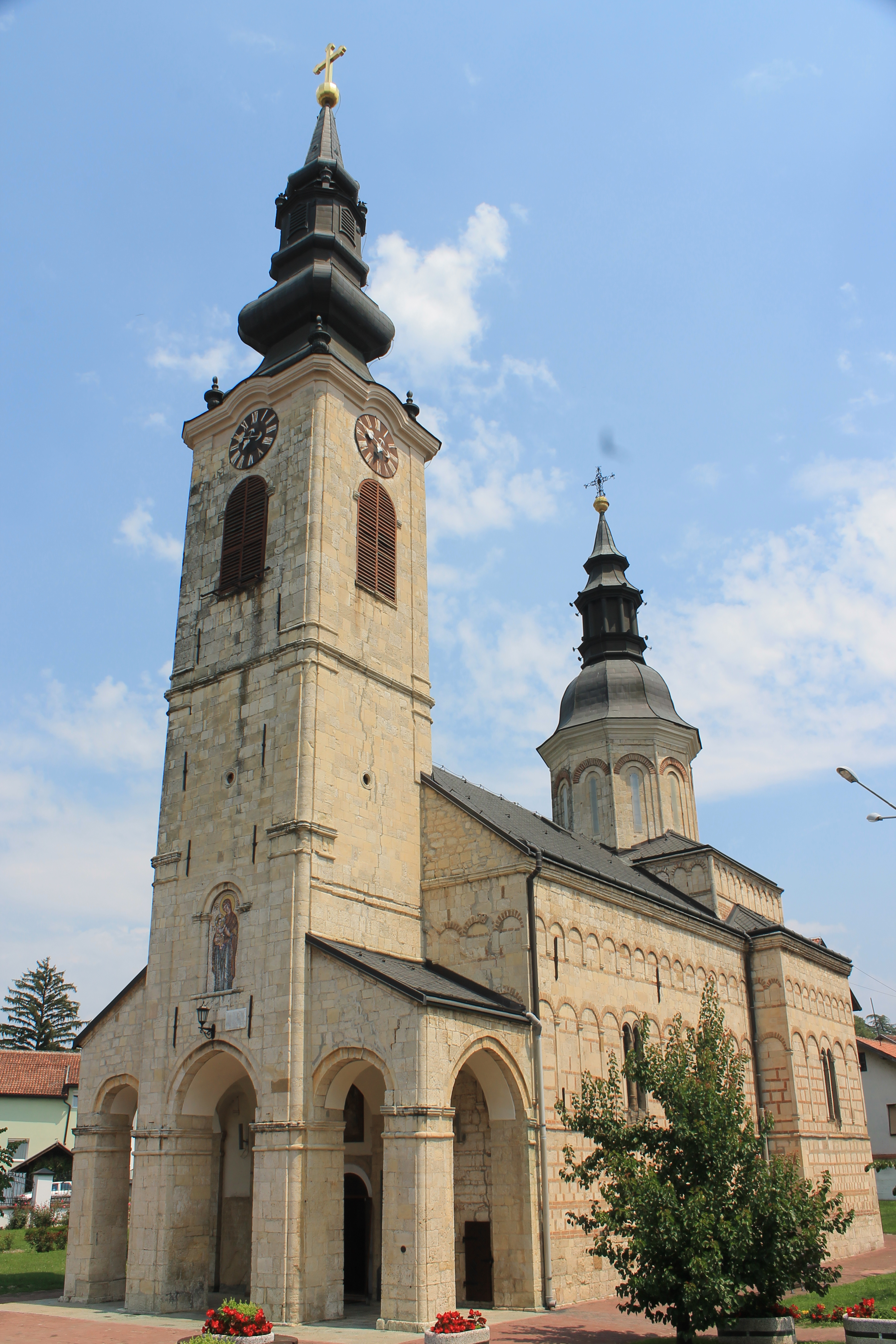
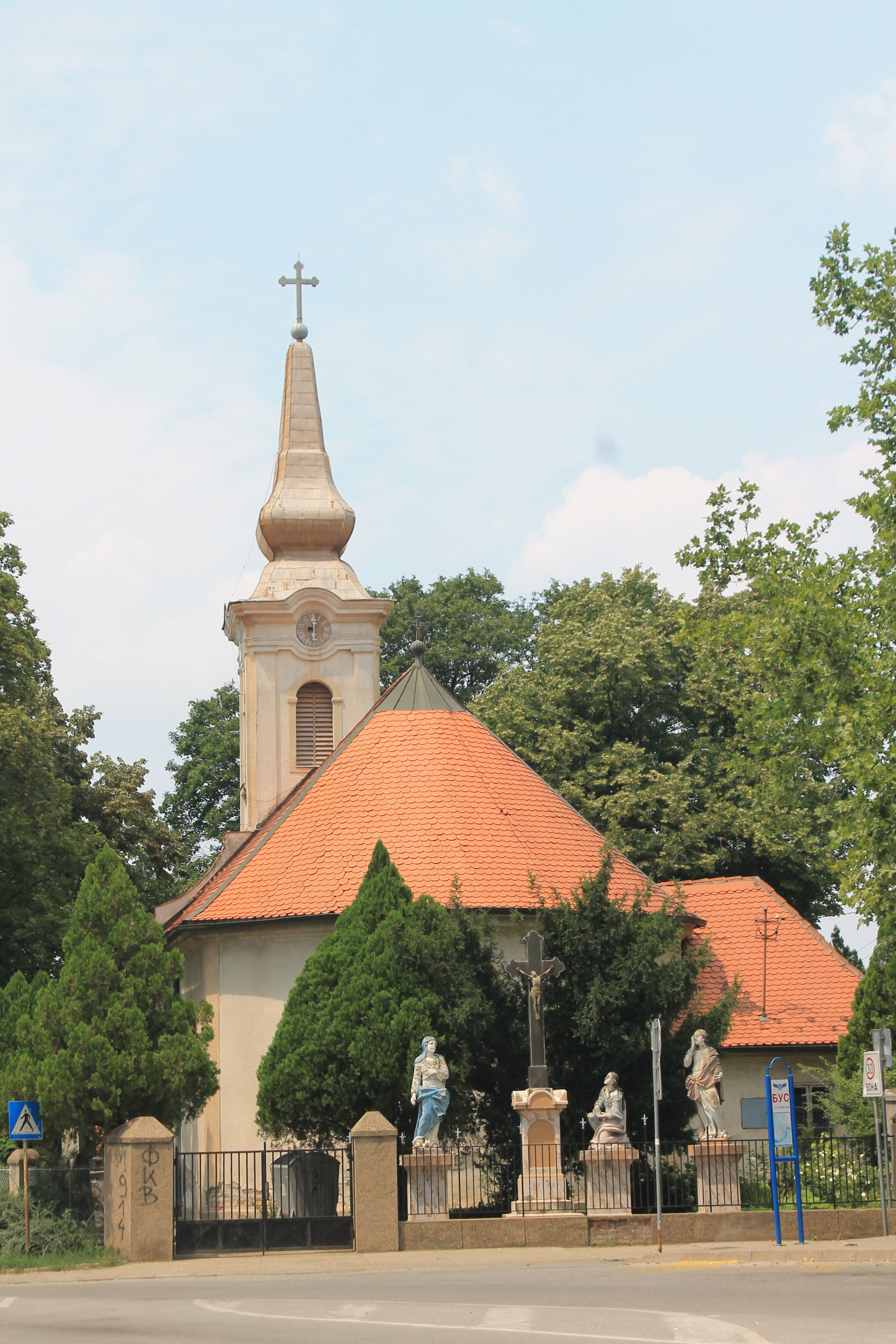
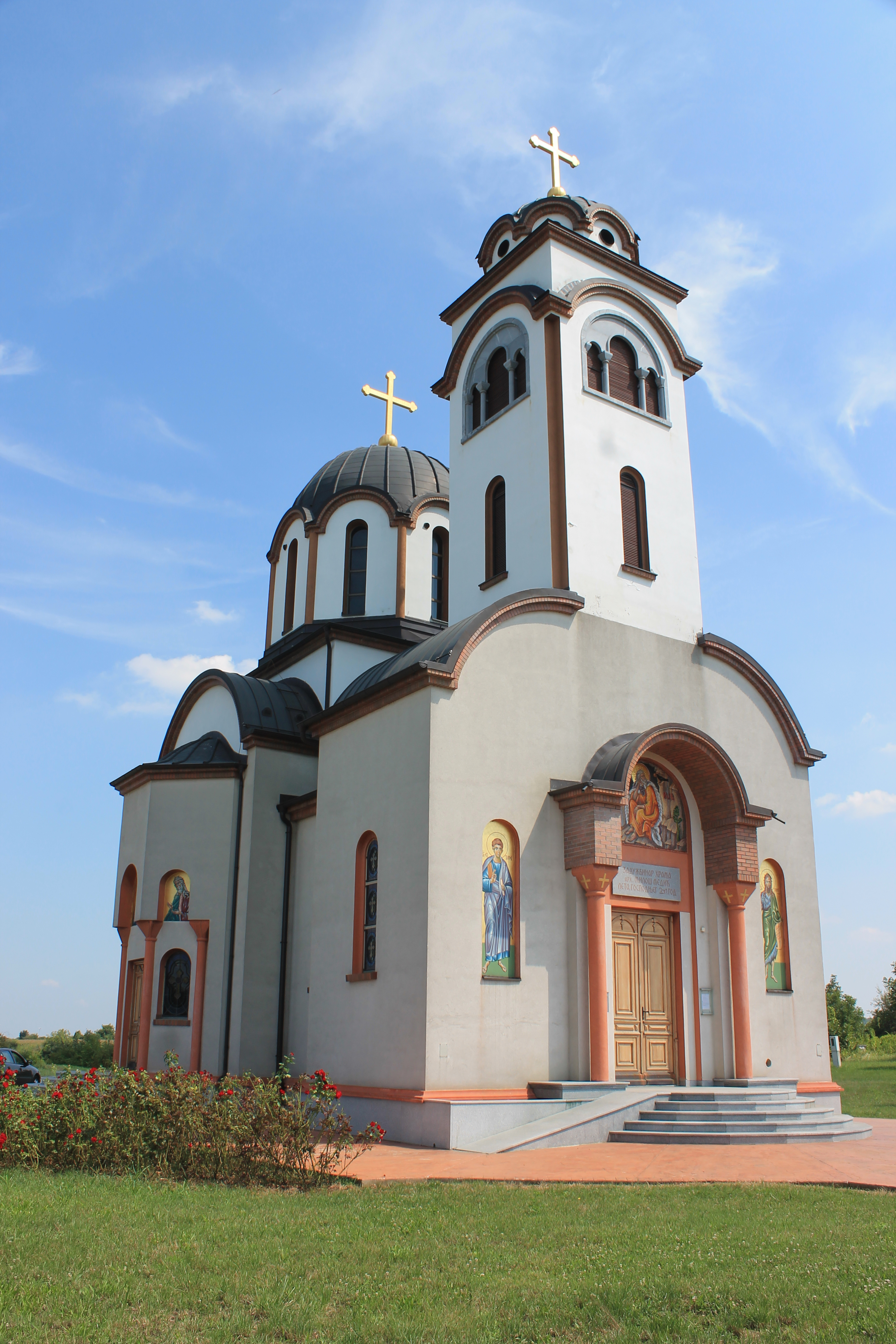
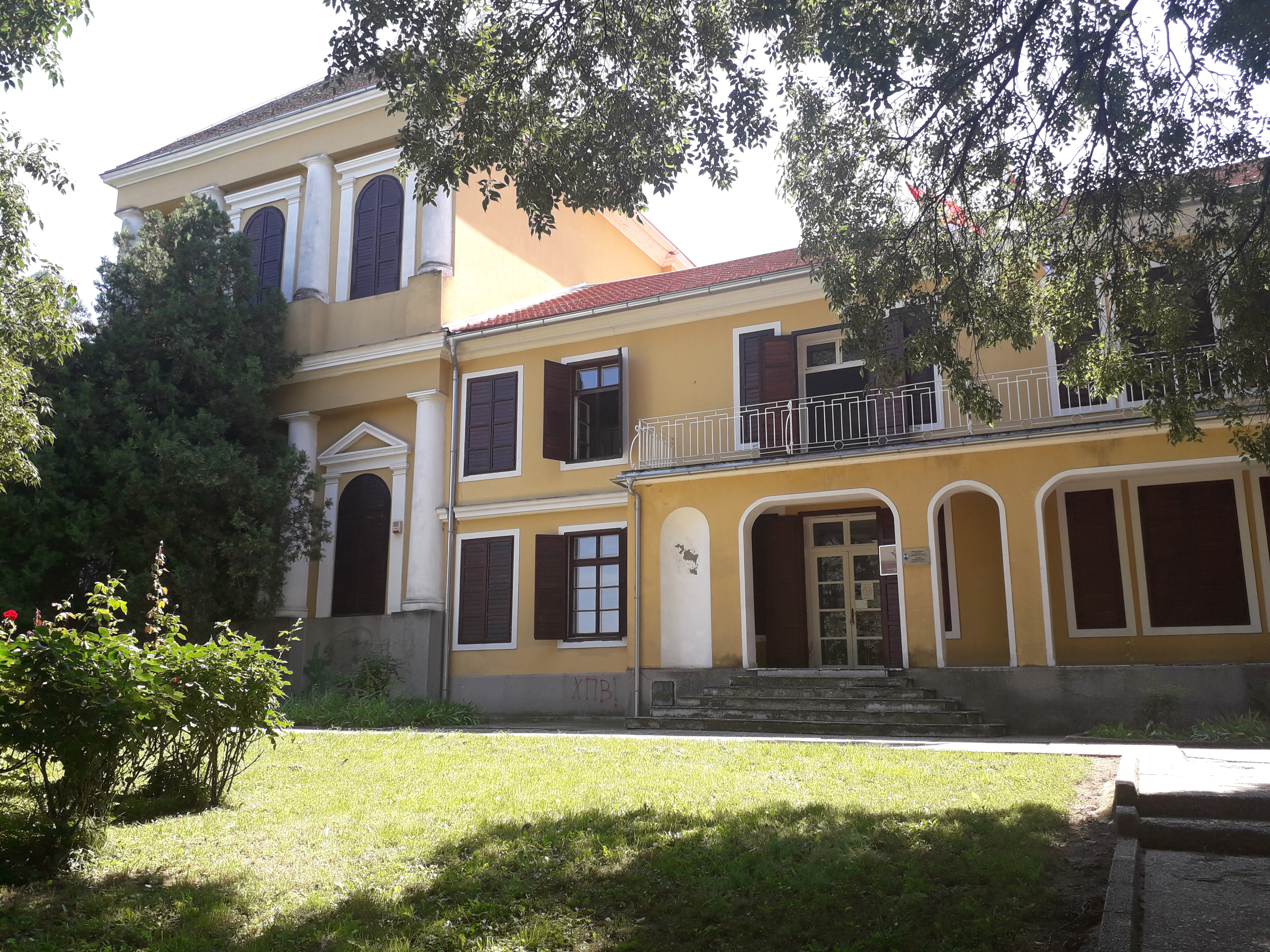
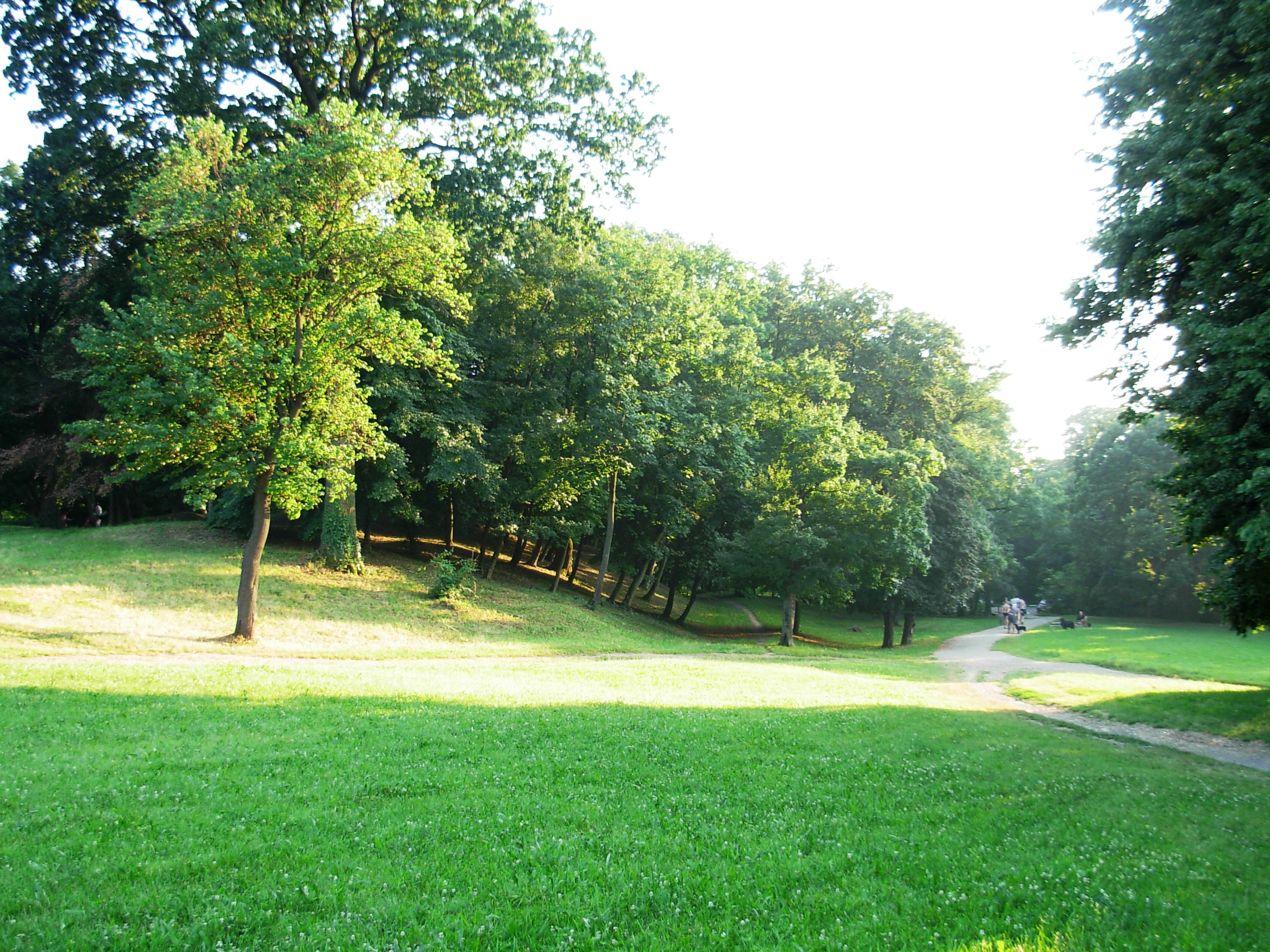
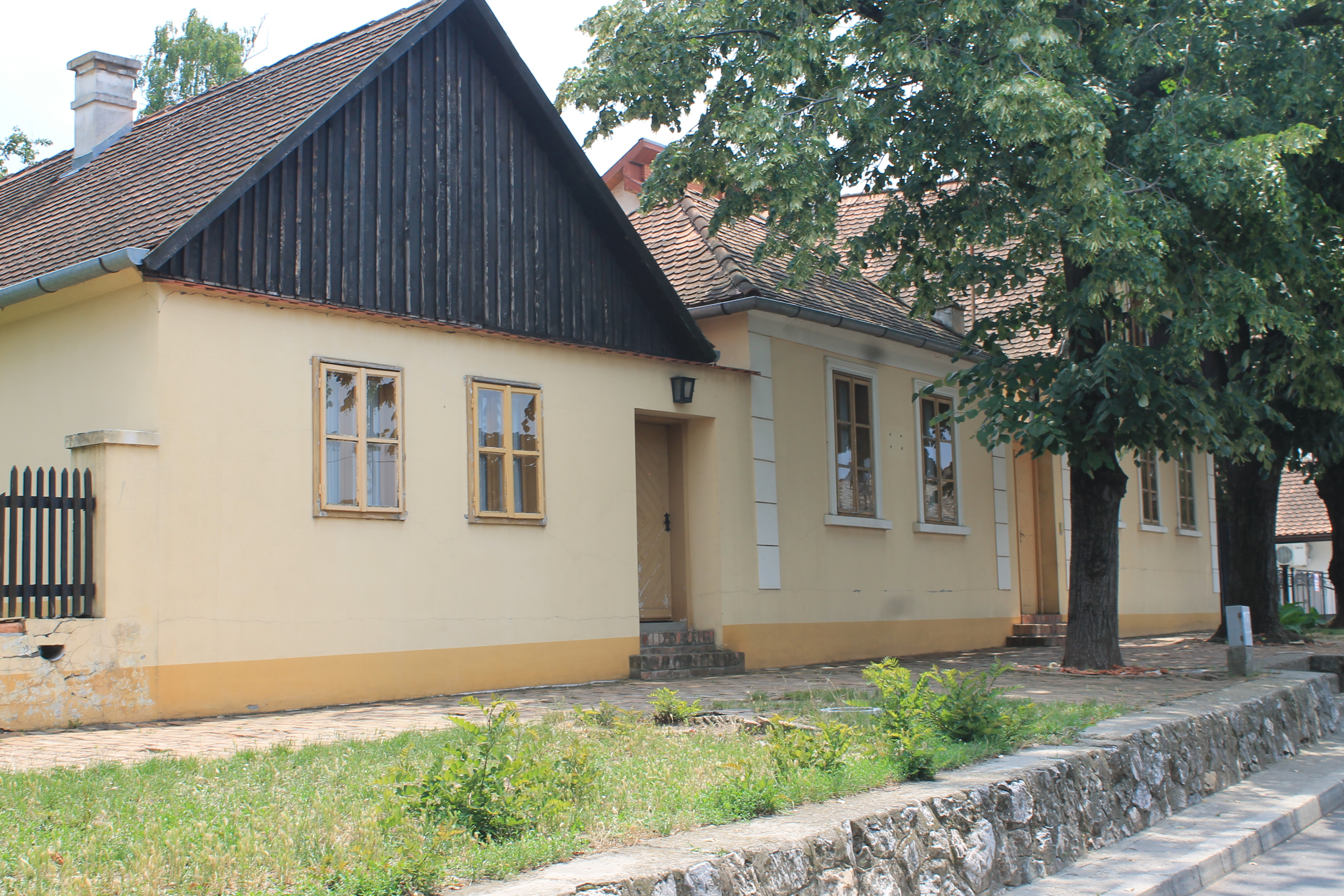
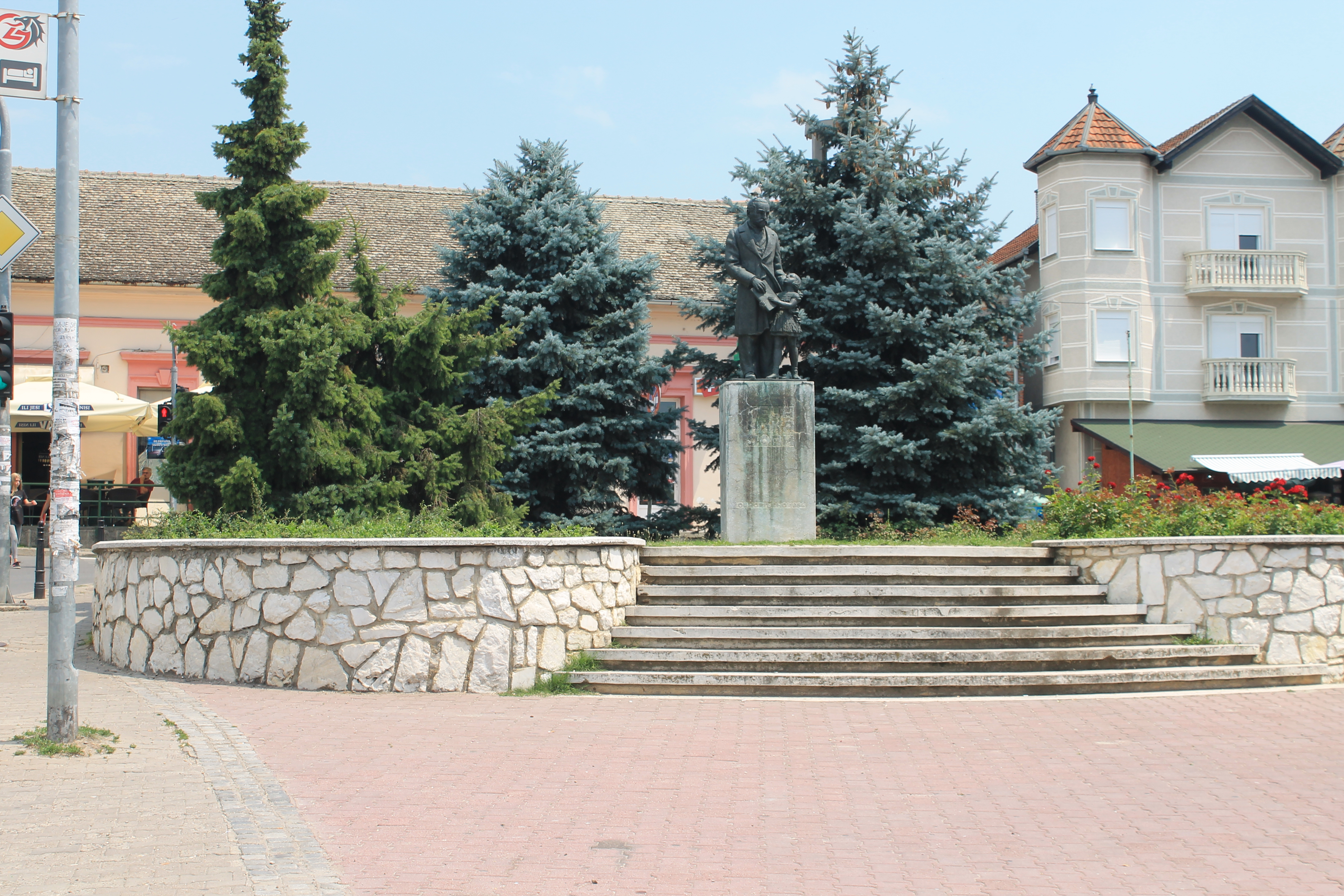
- Panorama of Sremska Kamenica Town Square Institute of Cardiovascular Diseases Church of the Nativity of the Theotokos Church of the Holy Cross Church of St. Prophet Elijah Marcibanji-Karačonji Castle Kamenica Park Jovan Jovanović Zmaj Museum Statue of Jovan Jovanović Zmaj

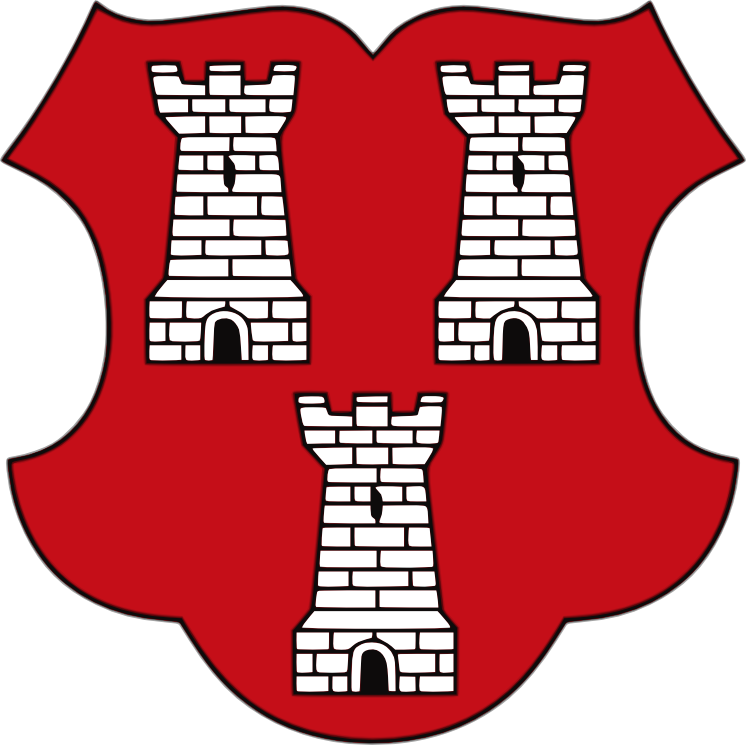
- Seal
- Interactive map of Sremska Kamenica
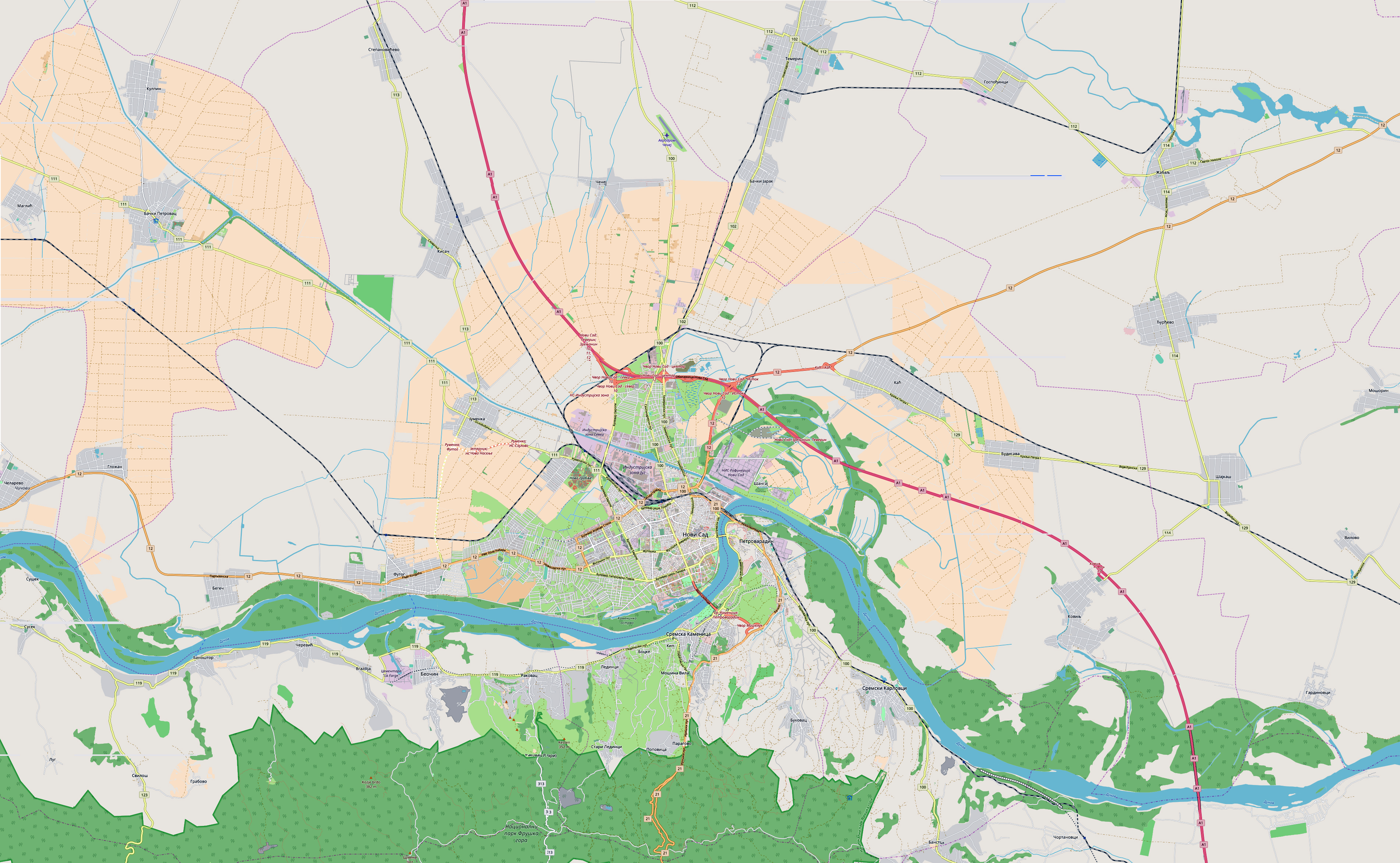
- Location within Novi Sad Sremska Kamenica (Vojvodina) Sremska Kamenica (Serbia)
- Coordinates: 45°13′14″N 19°50′21″E
- Country: Serbia
- Province: Vojvodina
- District: South Bačka
- Municipality: Petrovaradin

Area
  - Total: 30.49 km^{2} (11.77 sq mi)

Population (2022 census)
  - Total: 14,205
- Time zone: UTC+1
- Postal code: 21208
- Area code: + 381(0)21

Sremska Kamenica (Serbian Cyrillic: Сремска Каменица, pronounced [sreɛ̂ːmskaː kâmenit͡sa]) is a town and urban neighborhood of Novi Sad, in Serbia.

== Name ==
In Serbian, the town is known as Sremska Kamenica (Сремска Каменица), in Croatian as Srijemska Kamenica, in Hungarian as Kamánc, and in German as Kamenitz.

== Geography ==
The town is located in the Syrmia region, on the northern slopes of the Fruška Gora mountain range and on the river Danube. The Freedom Bridge crosses the River Danube and connects the town with the main part of Novi Sad. Sremska Kamenica and the villages Bukovac, Ledinci and Stari Ledinci, are all part of Petrovaradin urban municipality.

The town is divided into neighborhoods: Donja Kamenica (Lower Kamenica), Gornja Kamenica (Upper Kamenica), Bocke, Tatarsko Brdo, Čardak, and Staroiriški Put.

The settlements of Paragovo, Popovica, Glavica, and Artinjeva (Artiljevo) are also administratively parts of Sremska Kamenica. These settlements are a weekend retreat for people from Novi Sad into the countryside, because of their location on the edge of Fruška Gora National Park.

== History ==
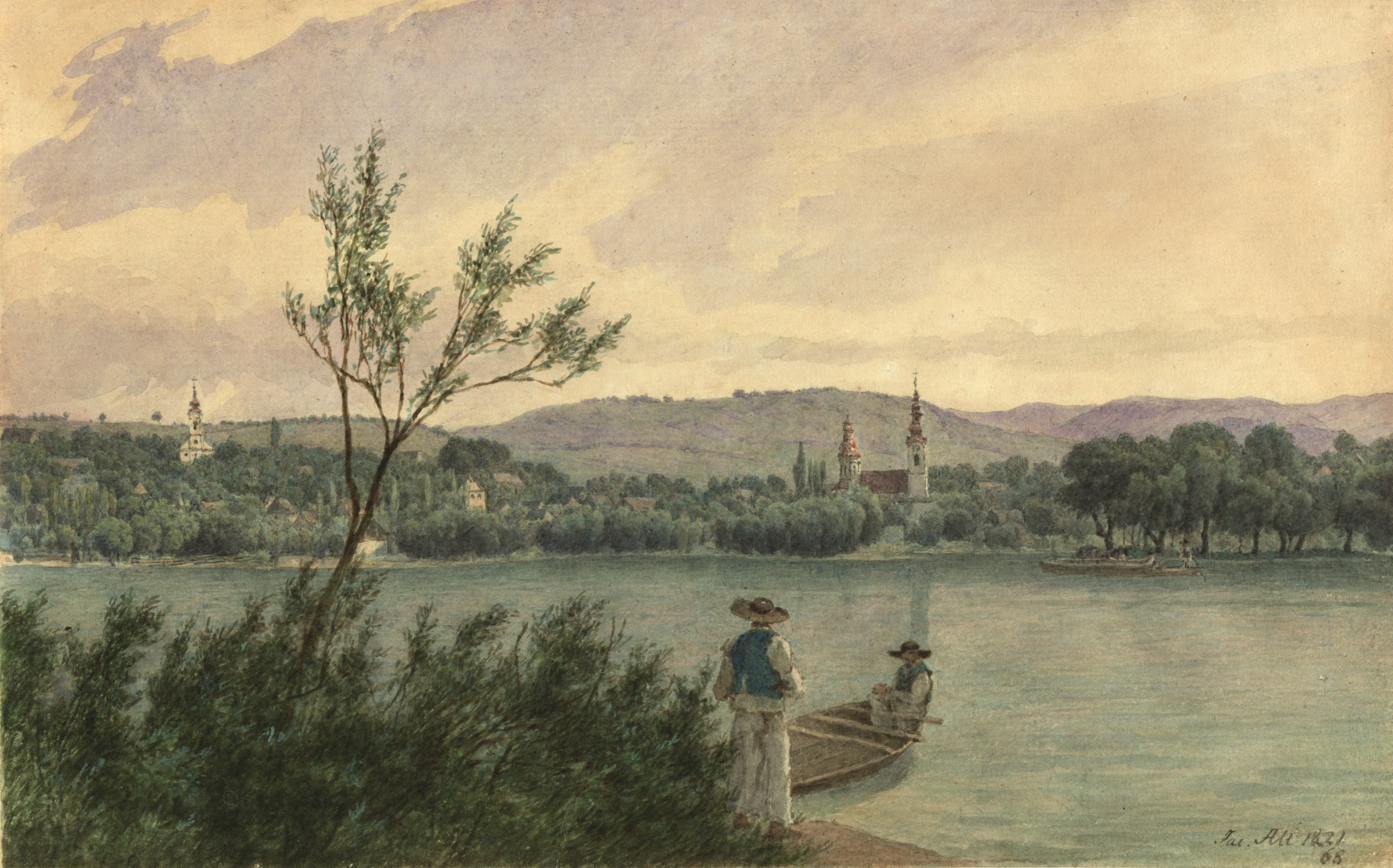
Sremska Kamenica in 1821

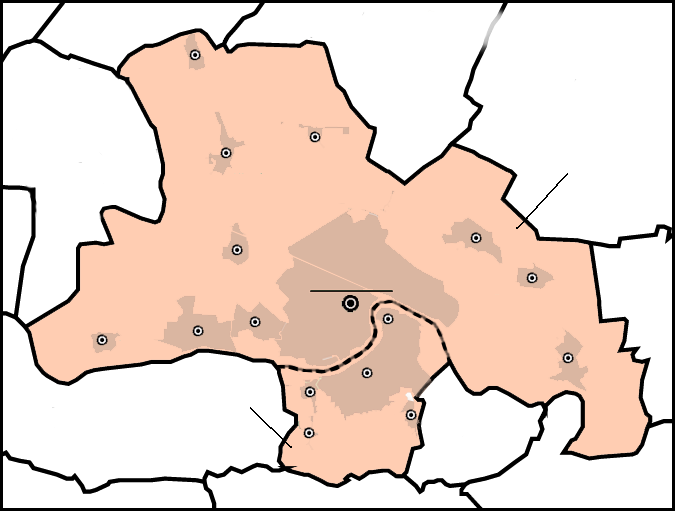

Sremska Kamenica was first mentioned in historical documents in 1237. In this time the town was administered by the Kingdom of Hungary, although its name has a Slavic origin. The name of the town derives from the Slavic word "kamen" ("stone" in English) and was recorded as "villa Camanch" in 1237 and "Kamenez" in 1349. In the 15th century, the town had a school and a theater. During the medieval Hungarian administration, it was a fortified town and was administratively a part of the Syrmia County.

Since the Ottoman conquest in 1521-1526, the town was part of the Ottoman Empire. In 1527-1530, it was part of the vassal Ottoman Duchy of Syrmia ruled by Serb duke Radoslav Čelnik, and subsequently came under direct Ottoman administration as part of the Ottoman Sanjak of Syrmia. Before the Ottoman conquest in the 16th century, the town had about 150 houses, while during the Ottoman administration, in 1567, the population of the town numbered 15 houses. The inhabitants of the town during Ottoman administration were Serbs.

After the establishment of the Habsburg administration in 1699, the Habsburg census from 1702 recorded 40 houses in the town, almost all of them populated by ethnic Serbs. During the 18th century, the number of Orthodox inhabitants increased to 1,000. Until the middle of the 18th century, the town was under military administration. The civil administration was introduced in 1745 and the town was included into Syrmia County, which was part of the Habsburg Kingdom of Slavonia. The town was also a possession of the Marcibanji and Karačonji families. In 1848-1849, the town was part of autonomous Serbian Vojvodina, and in 1849-1860 part of the Voivodeship of Serbia and Banat of Temeschwar. After the abolishment of the voivodeship in 1860, Kamenica was again incorporated into the Syrmia County of the Kingdom of Slavonia. In 1868, Kingdom of Slavonia was joined with the Habsburg Kingdom of Croatia into the Kingdom of Croatia-Slavonia, which was part of the Habsburg Kingdom of Hungary and Austria-Hungary. Administratively, the town was part of the Irig municipality. In 1910, the largest ethnic group in Kamenica were Serbs and the second largest were Croats. A smaller number of Hungarians, Germans and Slovaks lived there as well.

In 1918, the town firstly became part of the State of Slovenes, Croats and Serbs, then part of the Kingdom of Serbia and finally part of the Kingdom of Serbs, Croats and Slovenes (later renamed to Yugoslavia). From 1918 to 1922, Kamenica was part of the Syrmia county, from 1922 to 1929 part of the Syrmia oblast, and from 1929 to 1941 part of the Danube Banovina. During World War II, from 1941 to 1944, the town was occupied by Axis troops and was included into the Pavelić's Independent State of Croatia. Since 1944, the town is part of Vojvodina, which (from 1945) was an autonomous province of Serbia and Yugoslavia.

== Population ==
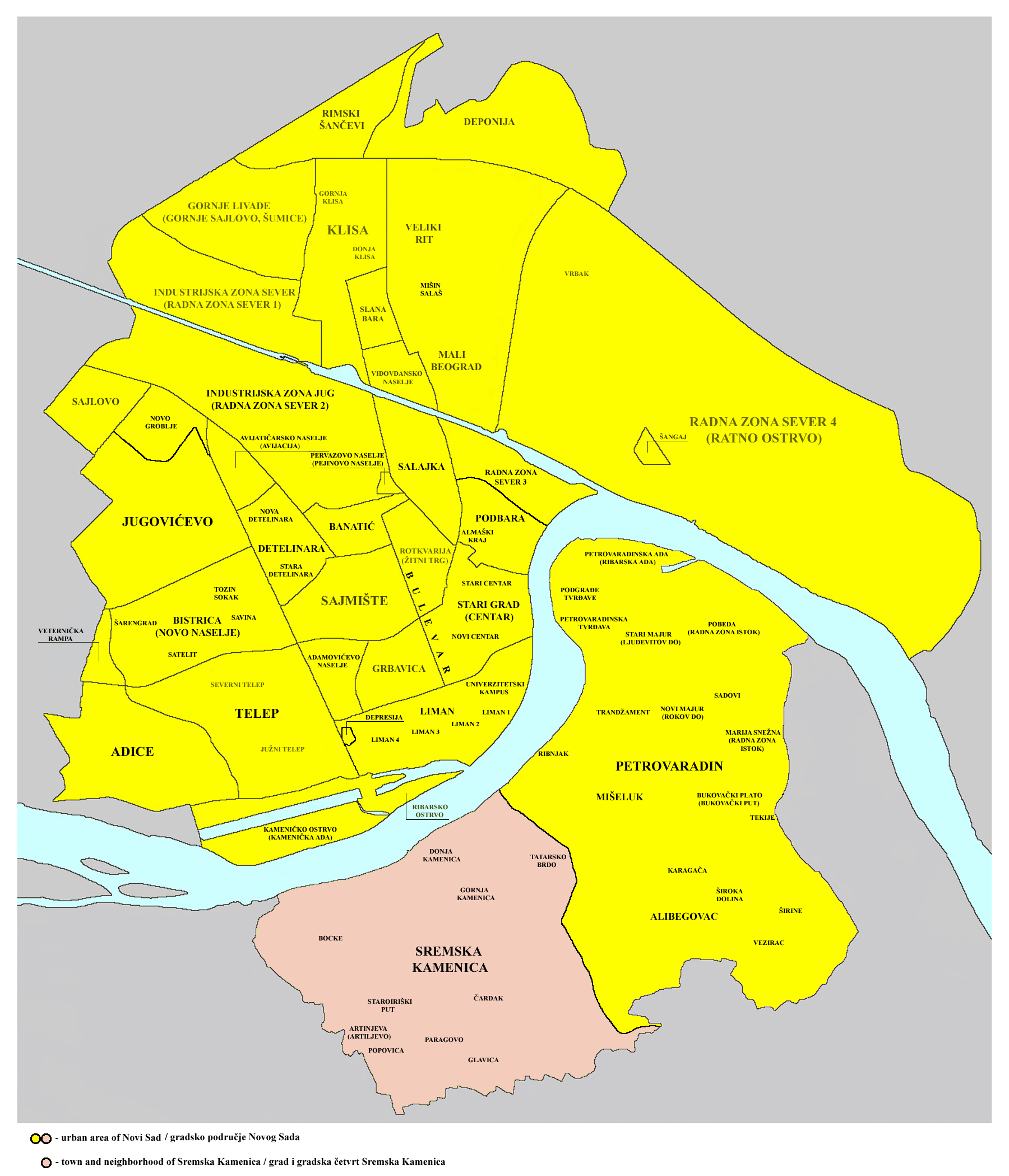
Map of the urban area of Novi Sad with city quarters, showing the location of Sremska Kamenica

According to the last official census (2002), the population of Sremska Kamenica numbered 14,205 inhabitants, of whom 11,806 were ethnic Serbs. Other ethnic groups include Croats (561), Yugoslavs (358), Hungarians (256), Montenegrins (141), Slovaks (102), and others. The population of the town also includes Serbs from Croatia and Bosnia and Herzegovina, who came here during the 1990s, escaping the wars in these two countries.

According to an unofficial estimate from 2005, the population of the town numbered 11,234 people.

Historical population:

- 1961: 3,646
- 1971: 5,051
- 1981: 7,532
- 1991: 7,955
- 2022:14,205

== Important institutions, buildings and tourist destinations ==
In Upper Kamenica, a small forest houses the Sremska Kamenica Institute, which is the most important and well known institute for cardiology, oncology, and pneumonic diseases in Serbia. There is also a police academy in Upper Kamenica; which until 2006 was the only secondary police school in Serbia.

In Lower Kamenica, there is a town square and the house of Jovan Jovanović Zmaj, now a museum dedicated to his memory. There are also Serbian Orthodox and Roman Catholic churches from the 18th century. Next to the Danube river is Kamenica Park with Castle of the Count Karačonji from the 17th century and SOS Dečije Selo (an orphanage).

The seat of the Fruška Gora National Park is situated in Sremska Kamenica, and there is also the University of Educons, the largest private university in Vojvodina. The owner of this university is professor Aleksandar Andrejević, and one of its professors is professor Branislav Radnović. Both of them reside in Sremska Kamenica.

== Events ==
- Zmaj Children Games (Zmajeve dečje igre)

== Famous people ==
- Jovan Jovanović Zmaj (1839–1904), one of the most well known Serb poets, lived and died in Sremska Kamenica.
- Novak Radonić (1826–1880), a well known Serbian romantic painter, was born in Mol, and lived and died in Sremska Kamenica.
- Teodor Janković Mirjevski (1741-1814)
- György Szerémi (around 1490 – after 1548) Latin: Georgius Sirmiensis; Croatian: Juraj Srijemac, Hungarian writer born here.

== See also ==
- List of places in Serbia
- List of cities, towns and villages in Vojvodina

== Twin towns ==
- Majosháza, Hungary
