= Fruškogorski maraton =

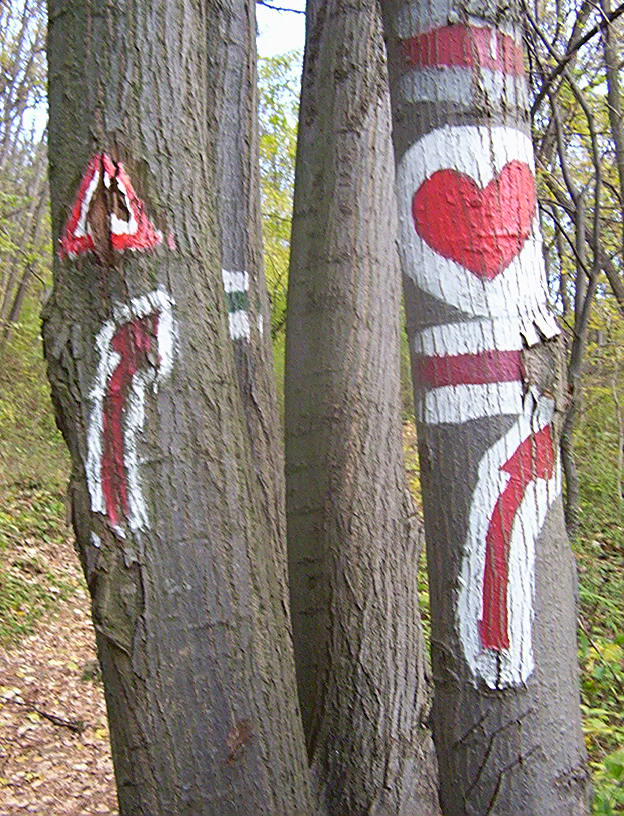
Trail marcation

Fruškogorski maraton is a yearly hiking and ultra running marathon held on the last weekend of April or the first of May on Fruška gora, Serbia. It is one of the oldest marathons of this type in Europe.

== History ==
The event was first held in 1978. These days it lasts for two days (Saturday/Sunday), with over 18,000 participants.

The marathon routes are marked throughout the woods, and Fruška Gora Marathon trails are marked with a red heart on a white background.

== Routes ==
The start and finish of the race is in Popovica, on the outskirts of the city of Novi Sad. The participants are divided into two categories: "sport" (competitive) and "fun" (non-competitive).

The trails of a competitive character are certified by the International Trail Running Association (ITRA) and are awarded a number of qualifying points for Ultra-Trail du Mont-Blanc.

Available marathon trails are:

Ultra trails

- Ultra Extreme Marathon; 134.3 km; 5,720 D+; 5 ITRA points
- Ultra Marathon; 108.2 km; 4,120 D+; 4 ITRA points

Great trails

- Great Southern Trail – NOT FOR 2025
- Great Eastern Trail – NOT FOR 2025
- Great Western Trail – NOT FOR 2025

Medium trails

- Medium Western Trail – NOT FOR 2025
- Medium Southern Trail – NOT FOR 2025
- Medium Eastern Trail; 59.6 km; 2,140 D+; 3 ITRA points

Small trails

- Small Eastern Extreme Marathon; 42.2 km; 2,090 D+; 2 ITRA points
- Small Western Extreme Marathon; 35.9 km; 1,520 D+
- Small Western Marathon; 33.1 km; 1,186 D+
- Small Eastern Marathon; 32.2 km; 1,313 D+
- Small Marathon West - West; 31 km; 1,458 D+

Trainee trails

- Trainee Southern Marathon; 22.7 km; 898 D+; 1 ITRA point
- Trainee Marathon West - West; 19.6 km; 719 D+
- Trainee Western Marathon; 18.8 km; 825 D+
- Trainee Eastern Marathon; 16.3 km; 640 D+
- Trainee Mini Marathon; 10.1 km; 470 D+

Joy and Pleasure Trail

- Joy and Pleasure Trail; 4.1 km; 184 D+

== See also ==
- Fruška Gora
