= Čardak, Sremska Kamenica =

Coordinates: 45.2116°N 19.8510°E

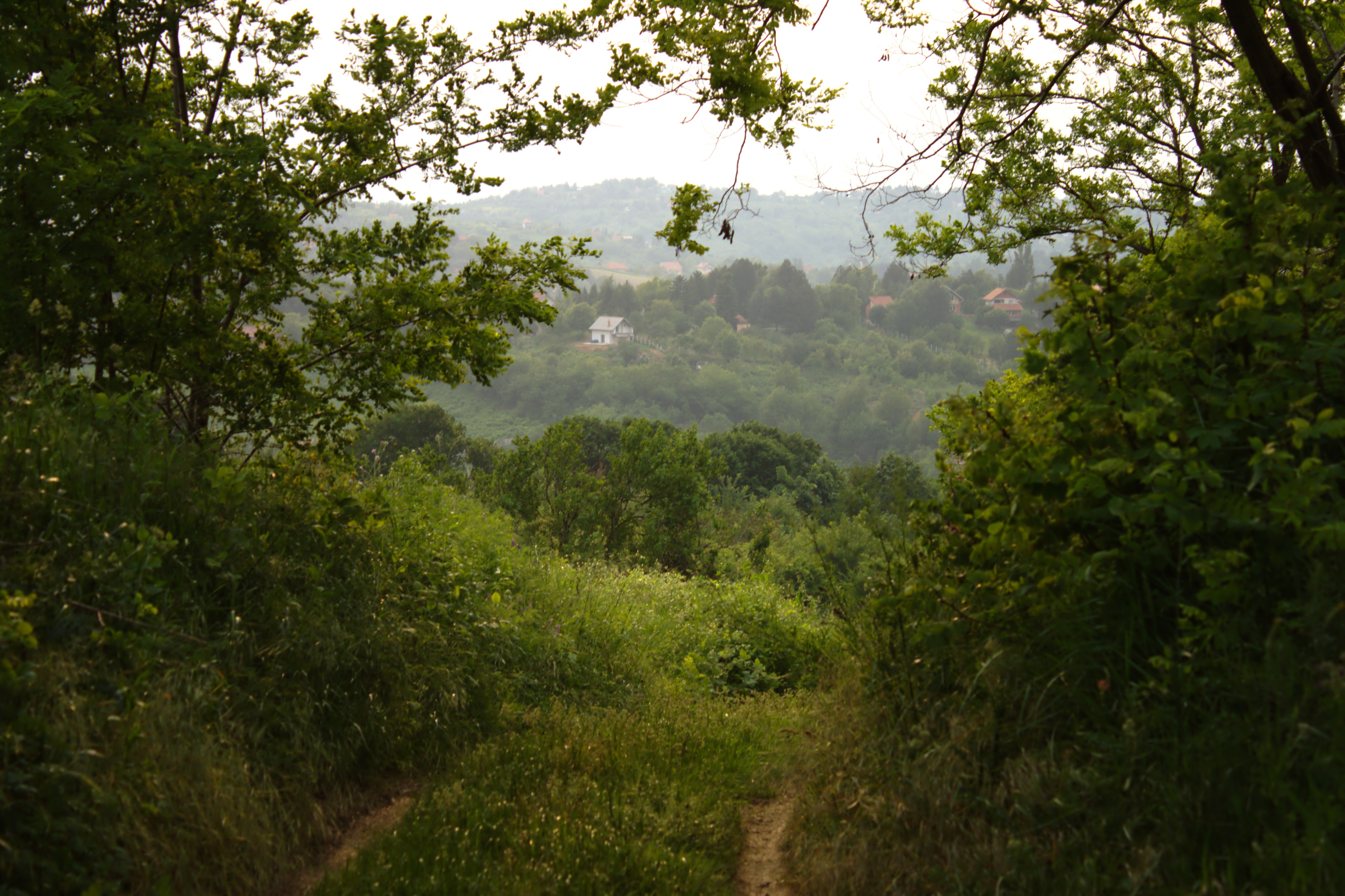
Čardak, Sremska Kamenica

Čardak (Cyrillic: Чардак) is a neighborhood of Sremska Kamenica, Serbia. This neighborhood is located on a hill, with an elevation of 190 m, overlooking Donja Kamenica to the north, Alibegovac to the east and Paragovo and Staroiriški Put to the west. Čardak is only a few kilometers from the border of Fruška Gora National Park.

From Čardak, there are also views of the western part of Novi Sad, Veternik and the Danube river. Čardak is connected to the Sremska Kamenica center and Novi Sad by JGSP Novi Sad bus line number 69 and 71 (only specific departures).

== Children’s Hospital for Treatment of Osteoarticular Tuberculosis ==
The English-Yugoslav Children’s Hospital for Treatment of Osteoarticular Tuberculosis was founded in Čardak by Katherine S. Macphail in 1934. The hospital was nationalized in 1947 and became part of the Orthopedic Surgery Department of the Faculty of Medicine in Belgrade in 1948. The hospital closed again due to lack of repairs and investments, but reopened during the Yugoslav Wars as a safe haven for fleeing refugees. It subsequently closed for economic reasons, but a statue of Macphail remains. A street in Čardak , where the hospital used to be, is now named after Katherine Macphail.
