= Popovica =

Small neighborhood of Sremska Kamenica, Serbia

Coordinates: 45.1909°N 19.8355°E

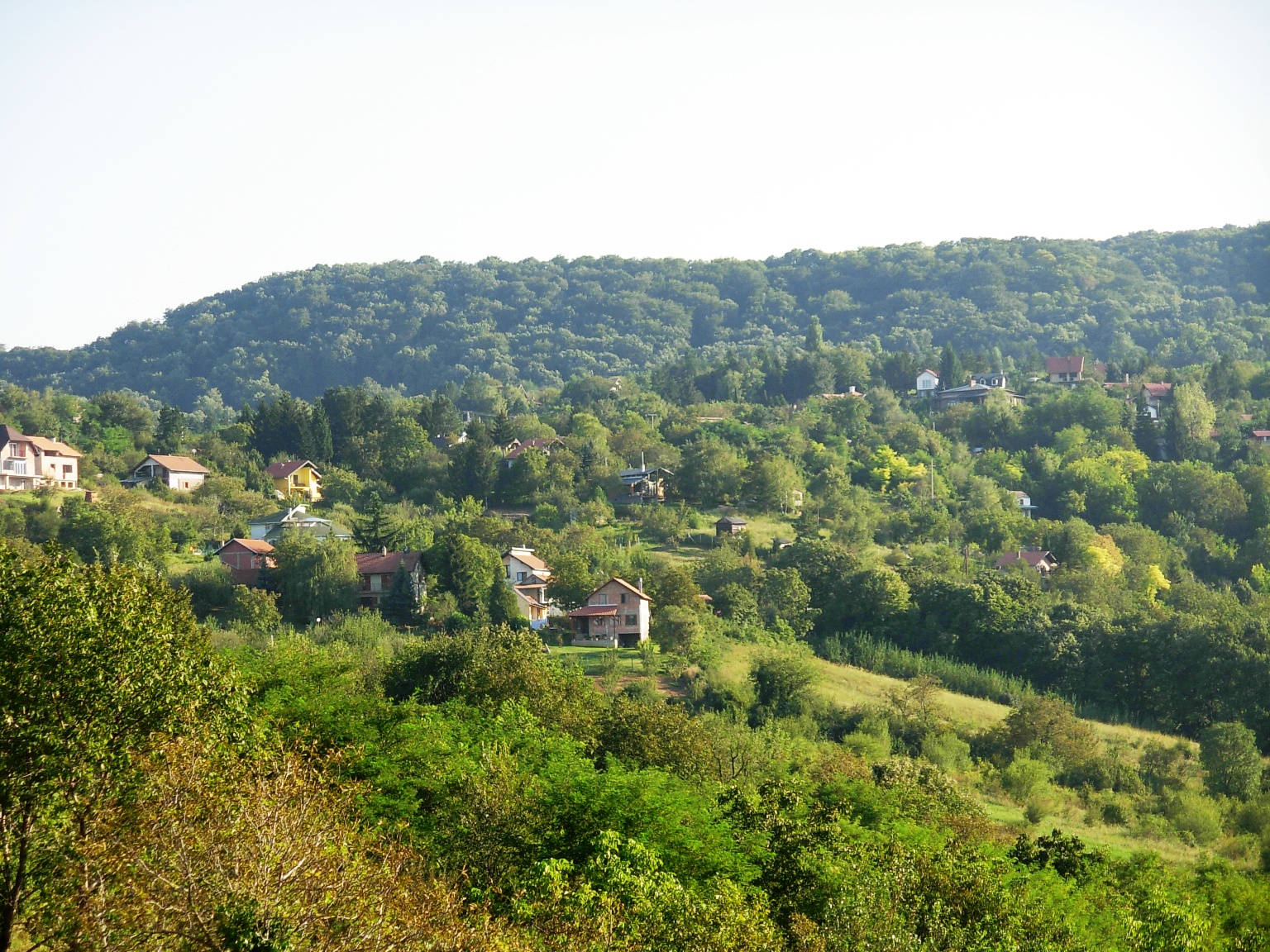
Popovica

Popovica (Cyrillic: Поповица) is a small neighborhood of Sremska Kamenica, Serbia. It is located on the edge of the urban area of Novi Sad and National Park of Fruška Gora. Popovica is connected to Sremska Kamenica and Novi Sad by public bus No.74. It is also the name of the nearby Mt. Popovica.

== See also ==
- Fruška Gora Marathon
