= Lake Ledinci =

Artificial lake in Syrmia, Vojvodina, Serbia

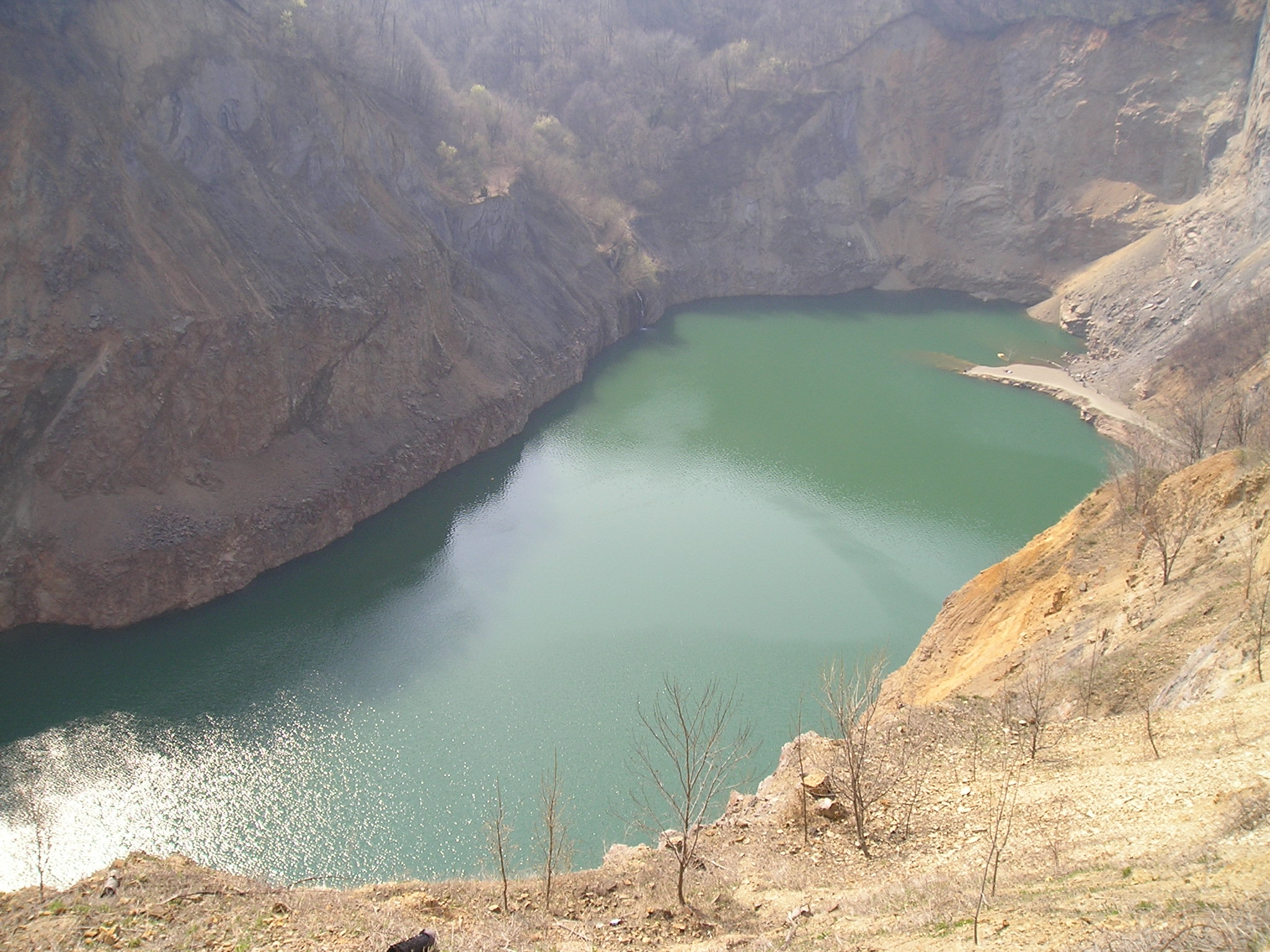

- Location within Vojvodina
- Location: Syrmia, Vojvodina
- Coordinates: 45°9′55″N 19°48′14″E
- Type: artificial lake
- Primary outflows: none
- Basin countries: Serbia
- Max. length: 400 m (1,300 ft)
- Max. width: 100 m (330 ft)
- Surface area: 4 ha (10 acres)
- Average depth: 15 m (49 ft)
- Max. depth: 50 m (160 ft)
- Surface elevation: 290 m (950 ft)
- Settlements: Stari Ledinci

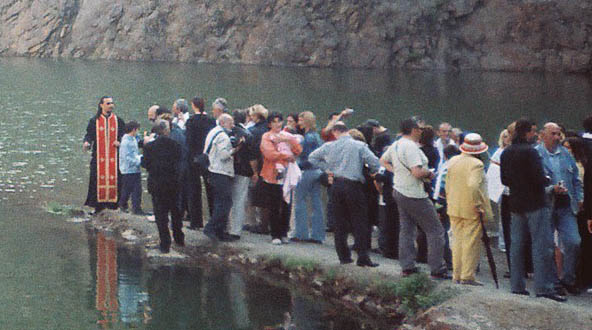
A mass baptism at the lake organized by the Serbian Orthodox Church in May, 2006

Lake Ledinci (Serbian: Лединачко језеро, romanized: Ledinačko jezero) is a small artificial lake on the mountain of Fruška Gora in Serbia, near the city of Novi Sad.

The lake was created during the NATO bombing of Yugoslavia in 1999, when pumps in the abandoned trachyte quarry of Srebro were damaged and stopped pumping the water out of the quarry. The subterranean waters, such as the waters from two creeks, Lukin Svetac and Srebrni potok, began filling the quarry.

== Characteristics ==
The lake covers an area of 4 hectares (9.9 acres) and is surrounded by steep cliffs from most sides, with a slope on one side to allow swimmers to enter. It is bean-shaped, with a length of about 400 metres and a greatest width of about 100 m. The average depth is 15 m with a maximum depth of 50 m. The lake is at an elevation of 300 m. The water is characteristically green and clear, due to the constant influx from feeding springs, and chilly even on hot summer days.

Because the lake had no outflow, the water level rose continuously, which represented a threat to the village of Stari Ledinci.

== History ==
In the late 1990s and early 2000s, exploitation rights on the lake were under a multilateral dispute by the local community, the City of Novi Sad, the mining company Alas registered in Rakovac, which owned the quarry exploitation rights, and the public company guiding the National park of Fruška Gora. Due to frequent incoherent court and municipality decisions, the lake was at threat of disappearing at the moment, because the mining company required to be back in possession, and the lake was deemed unsafe due to possible water breakthrough. The rumours in 2006 that the rights for the continuing use of quarry were sold to a certain Austrian firm were repudiated by the National park of Fruška Gora management, saying that Assembly of Vojvodina already adopted a plan to keep the lake. Ultimately, the disputes ended in favor of retaining the lake, which is an attraction of the national park, and making it a tourist resort.

The future of the lake is uncertain. From 2001 to 2006, it was a small tourist resort, and the local community of Stari Ledinci village and the company that run it were ambitious to expand the tourist services. However, in June 2006, an avalanche from the stone walls injured several swimmers, and the public access to the lake was forbidden. Subsequently, the Republic Inspection for Environment Protection ordered the lake to be immediately emptied (as the old order from 2002 was not carried out), as the water level reached the edges, and started leaking out. Also, the Republic Bureau of Environmental Protection issued an opinion that the further stone exploitation must be ceased in the first phase, with appropriate protection and biological cultivation works performed, and the lake's purpose to be changed to a recreation site in the second phase.

In July 2009 the lake was emptied, and Alas continued operating the quarry after obtaining permits from the relevant ministries. The company claims that after the permit expires in 8 to 10 years, it will be recultivated and again turned into a lake, and be an anchor of future spectacular nature park. Ecologists and villagers remained suspicious toward those plans.

== Trivia ==
In 2003, Zdravko Čolić recorded a video for his song "Ao, nono bijela" at Lake Ledinci. Scenes for the film We Are Not Angels 3: Rock'n' Roll Strike Back (2006) and Charleston for Ognjenka (2008) were filmed at the lake.

== See also ==
- Stari Ledinci
- Novi Ledinci
- Fruška Gora
