= Ledinci =

Ledinci Лединци (Serbian)
- Suburban settlement
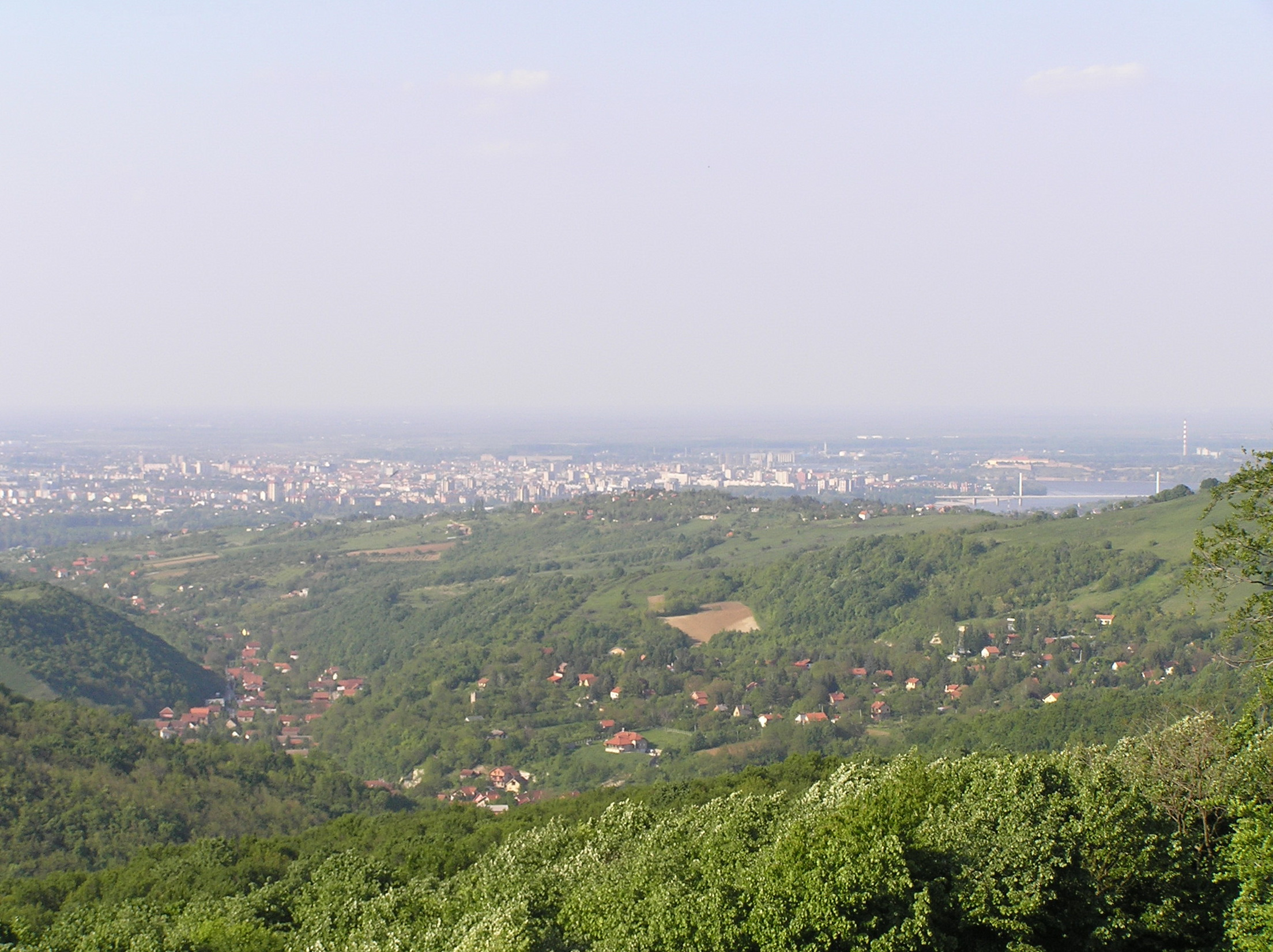
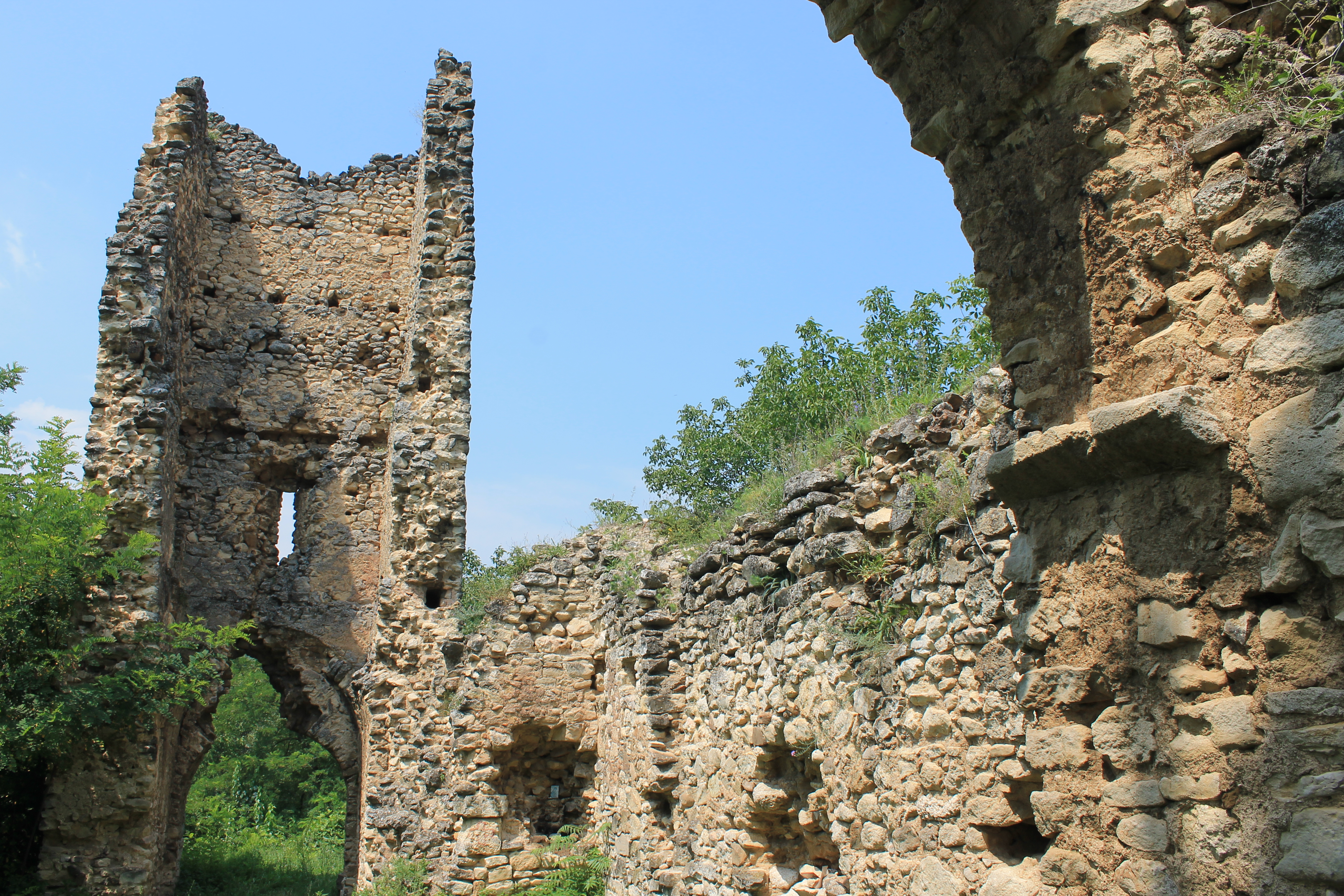
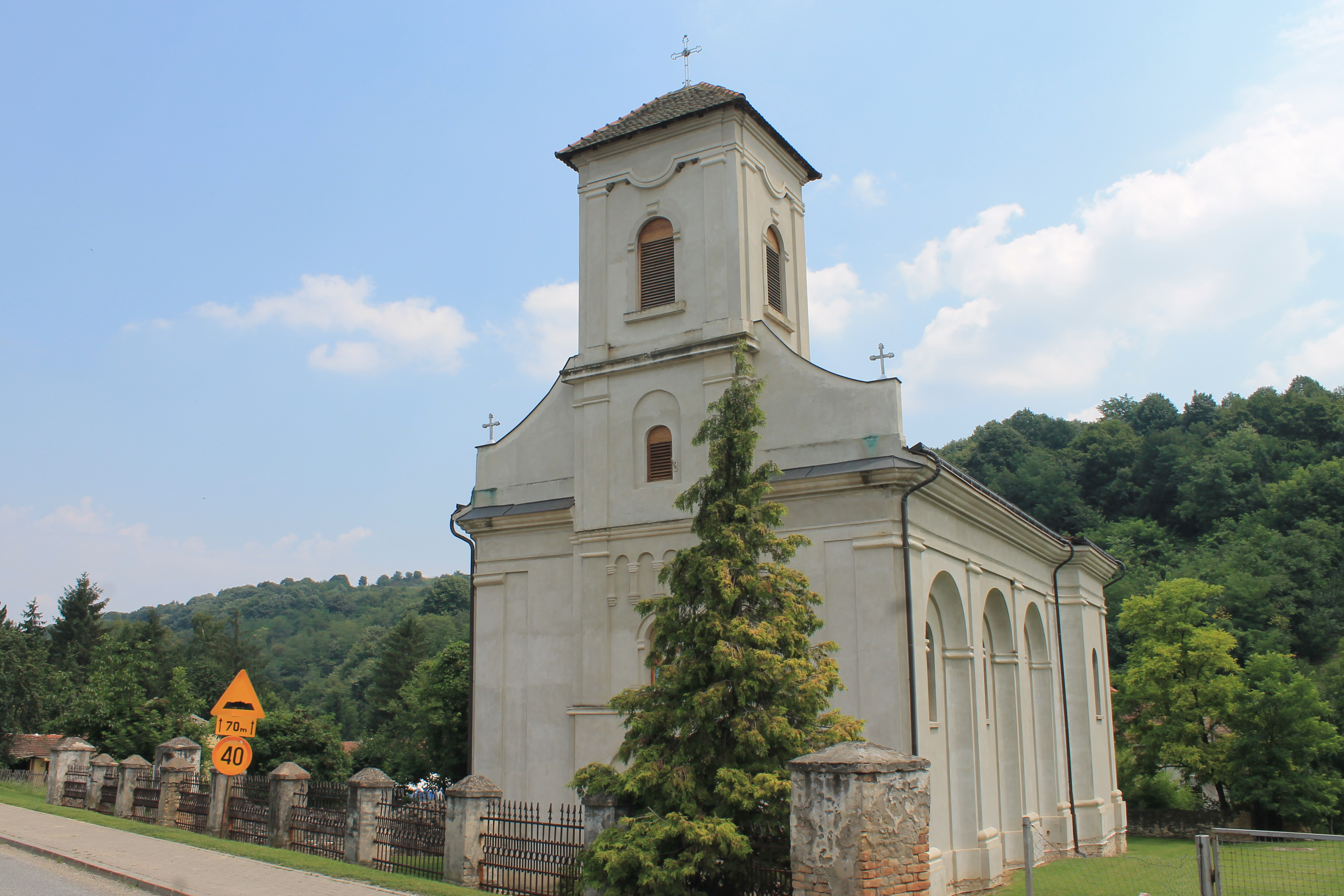
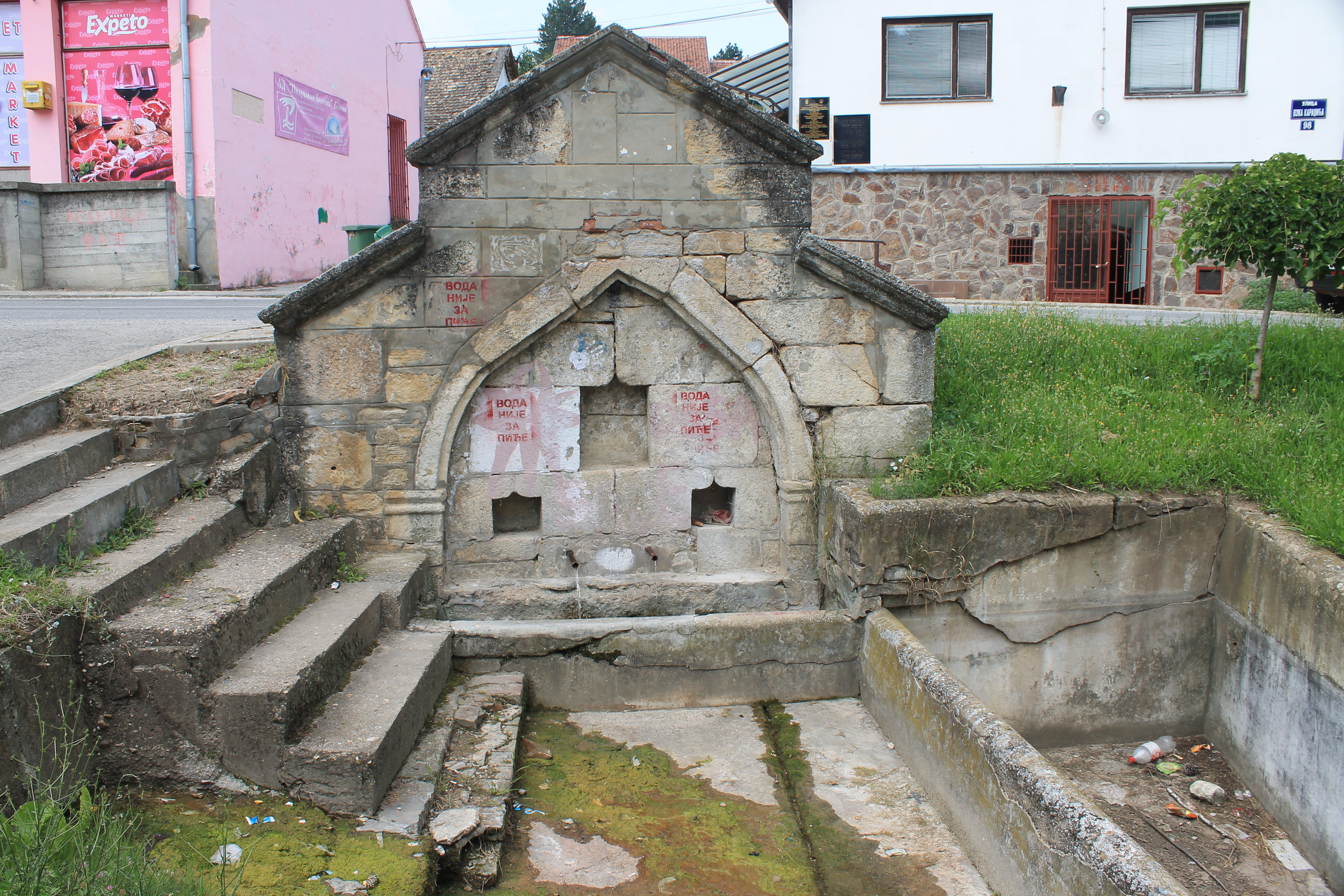
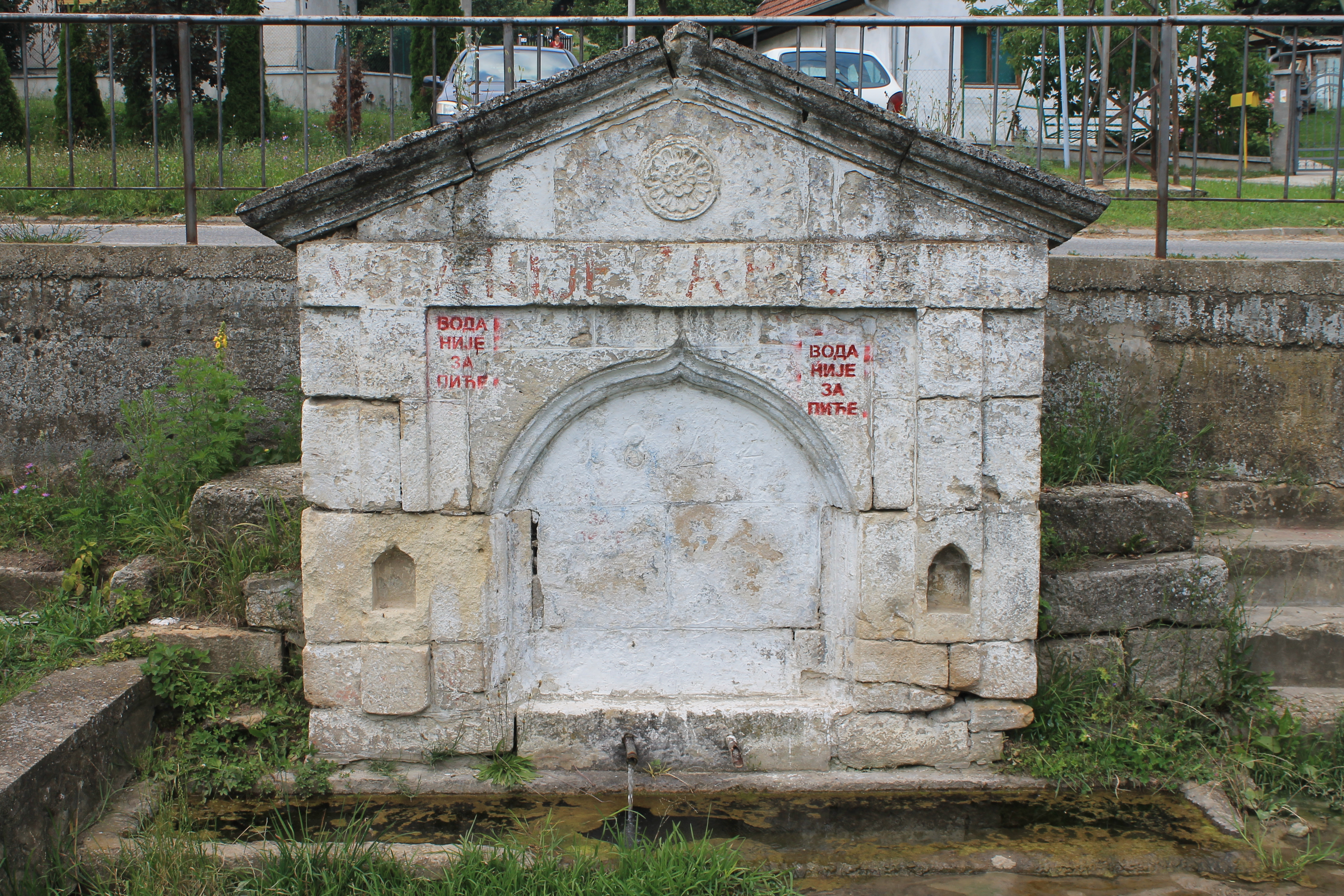
- Ledinci

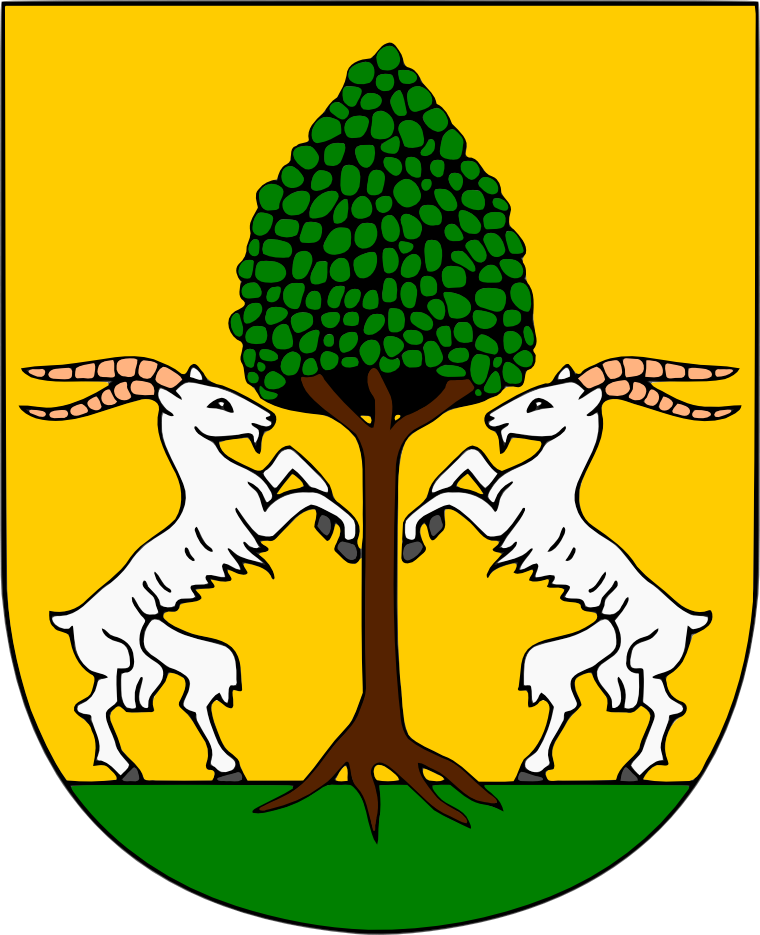
- Seal
- Interactive map of Ledinci
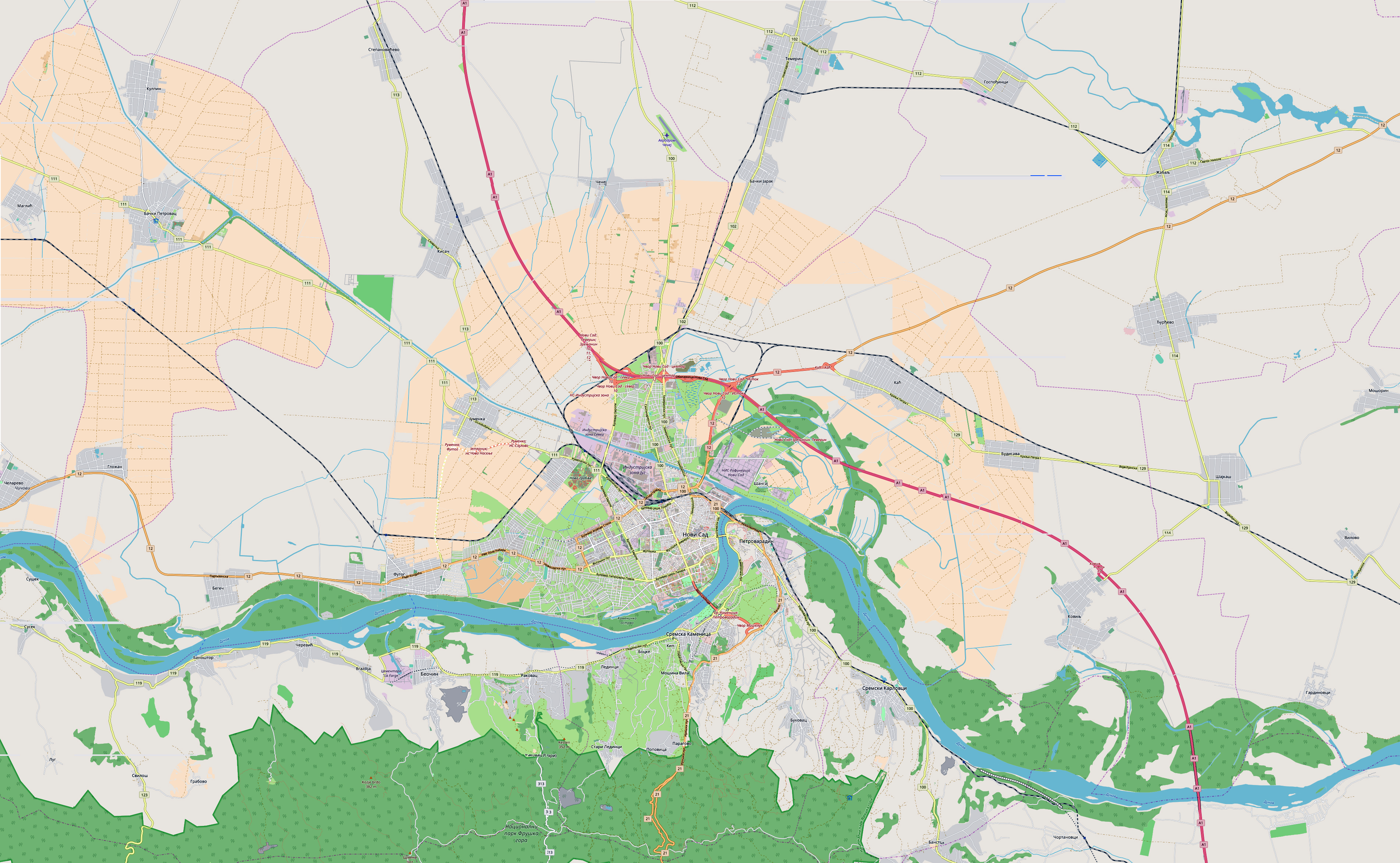
- Location within Novi Sad Ledinci (Vojvodina) Ledinci (Serbia)
- Coordinates: 45°12′39″N 19°48′13″E
- Country: Serbia
- Province: Vojvodina
- District: South Bačka
- Municipality: Petrovaradin

Area
  - Total: 7.90 km^{2} (3.05 sq mi)

Population (2011)
  - Total: 1,912
  - Density: 242/km^{2} (627/sq mi)
- Time zone: UTC+1 (CET)
  - Summer (DST): UTC+2 (CEST)
- Area code: +381(0)21
- Car plates: NS

Ledinci (Serbian Cyrillic: Лединци) also known as Novi Ledinci (Serbian Cyrillic: Нови Лединци) is a suburban settlement located in the Petrovaradin municipality, one of two municipalities of the city of Novi Sad, Serbia. It is situated in the Autonomous Province of Vojvodina. The village is part of the metropolitan area of Novi Sad.

== Name ==
The name of the settlement in Serbian is plural.

== Population ==
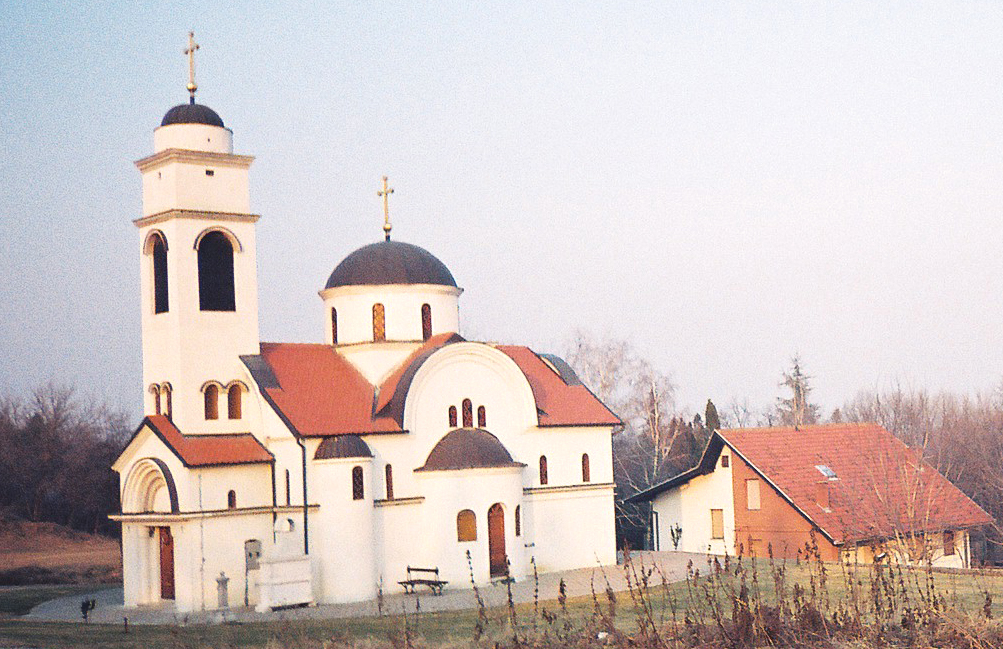
Orthodox Church in Ledinci

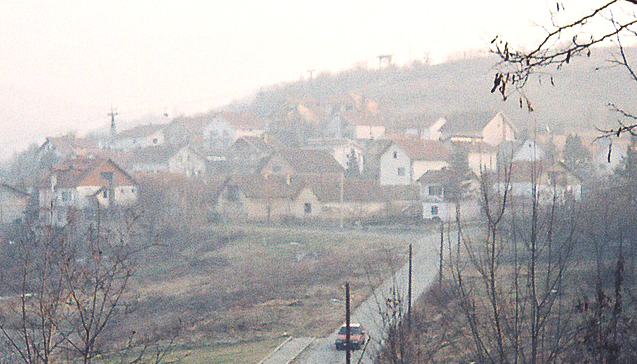
Ledinci

Most of the inhabitants are ethnic Serbs.

Historical population
Year	Pop.	±%
1948	465	—
1953	531	+14.2%
1961	675	+27.1%
1971	795	+17.8%
1981	1,137	+43.0%
1991	1,280	+12.6%
2002	1,641	+28.2%
2011	1,912	+16.5%
Source: Census

== Geography ==
The village is geographically located in Srem, but it is part of South Bačka District. There are two villages with this name: Novi Ledinci (New Ledinci) and Stari Ledinci (Old Ledinci). Today, the name "Ledinci" is officially used to designate Novi Ledinci, while other village is officially known as Stari Ledinci. Both villages are located in Petrovaradin municipality, on the brows of Fruška Gora mountain.

== History ==
The village of Novi Ledinci was founded after the Second World War. It was built for inhabitants of Stari Ledinci, since this village was destroyed during the war. Later, the village of Stari Ledinci was rebuilt too.

== Gallery ==
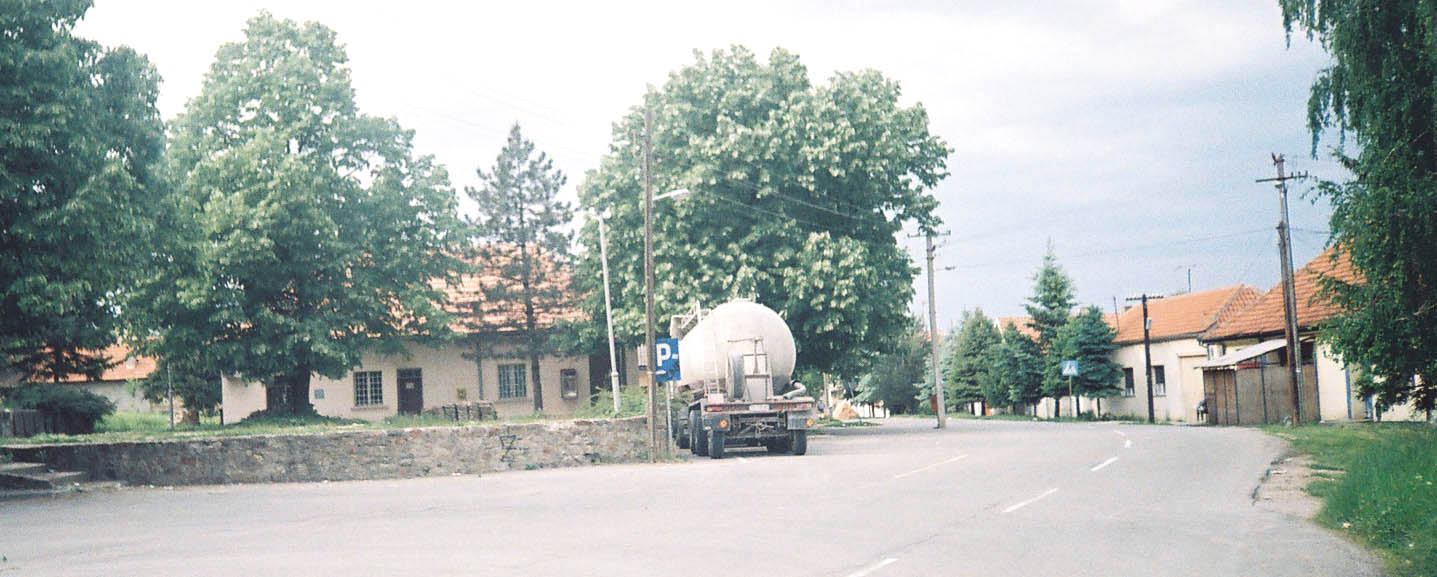
Center of the village

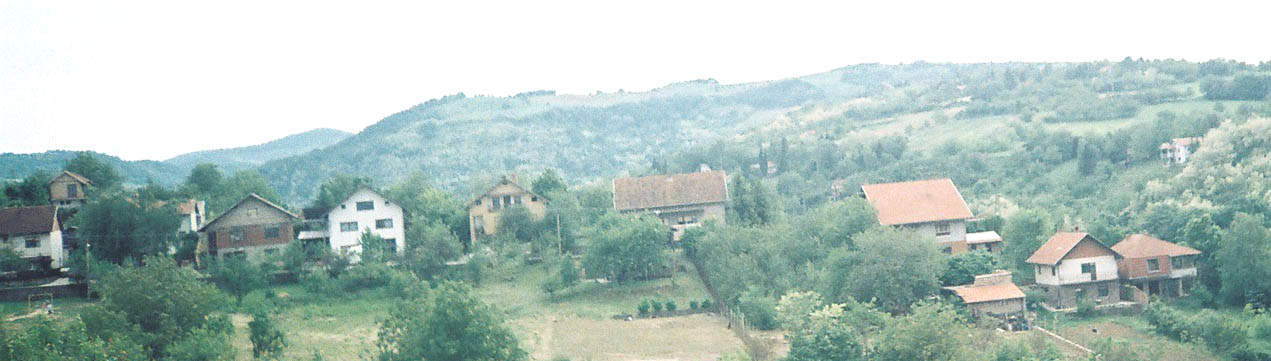
Ledinci

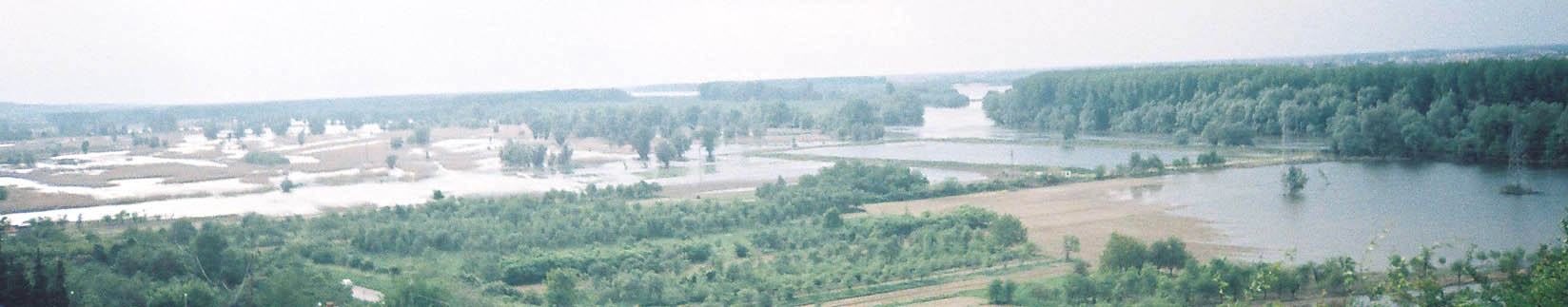
Flood of the Danube river near Ledinci in 2006

== See also ==
- Stari Ledinci
- Ledinci Lake
- Fruška Gora
- List of places in Serbia
- List of cities, towns and villages in Vojvodina
