= Stari Ledinci =

Stari Ledinci Стари Лединци (Serbian)
- Suburban settlement
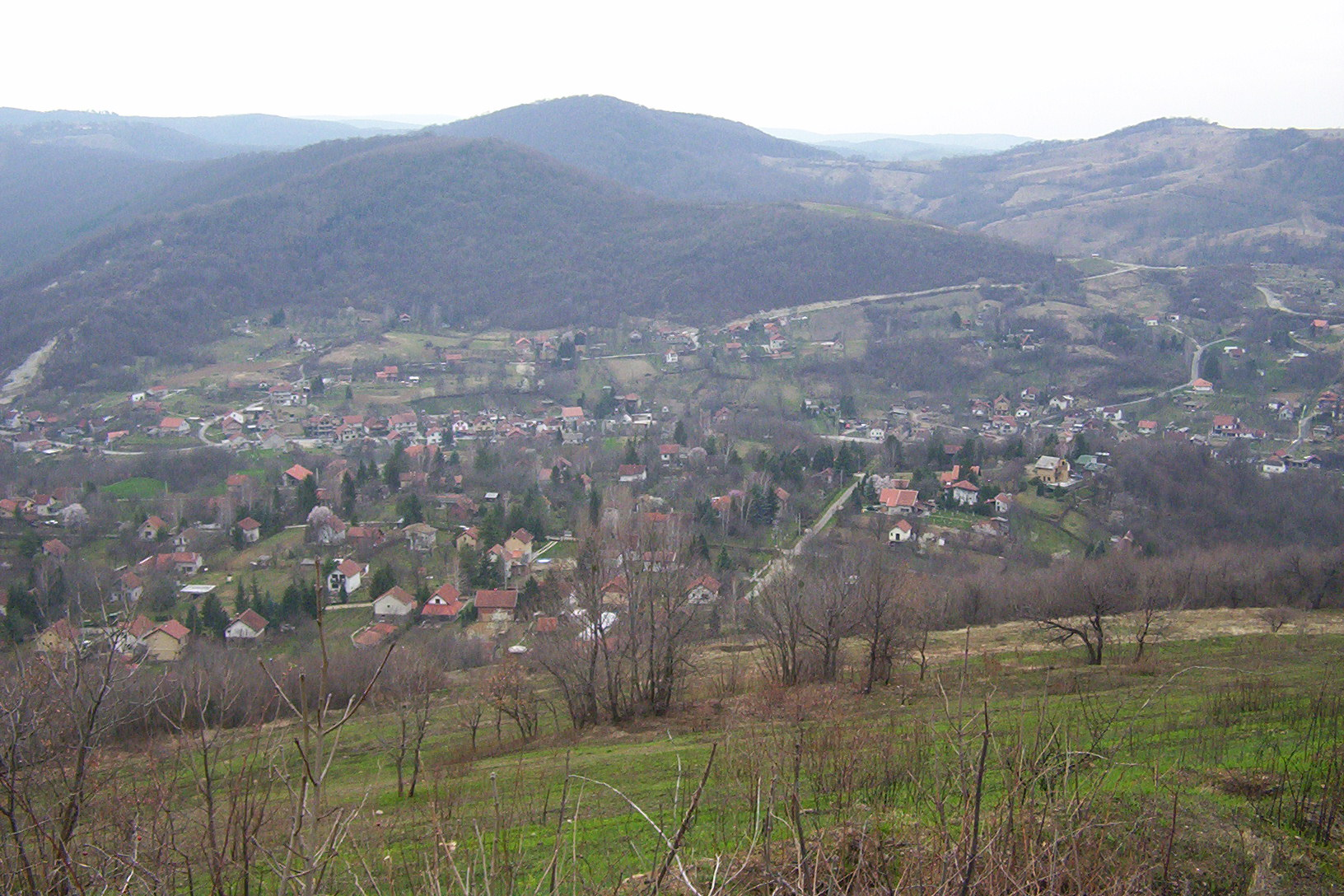
- Scenic view of the village from a hilltop

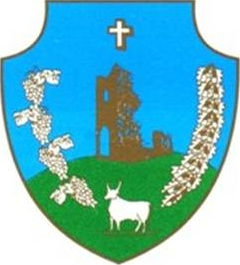
- Seal

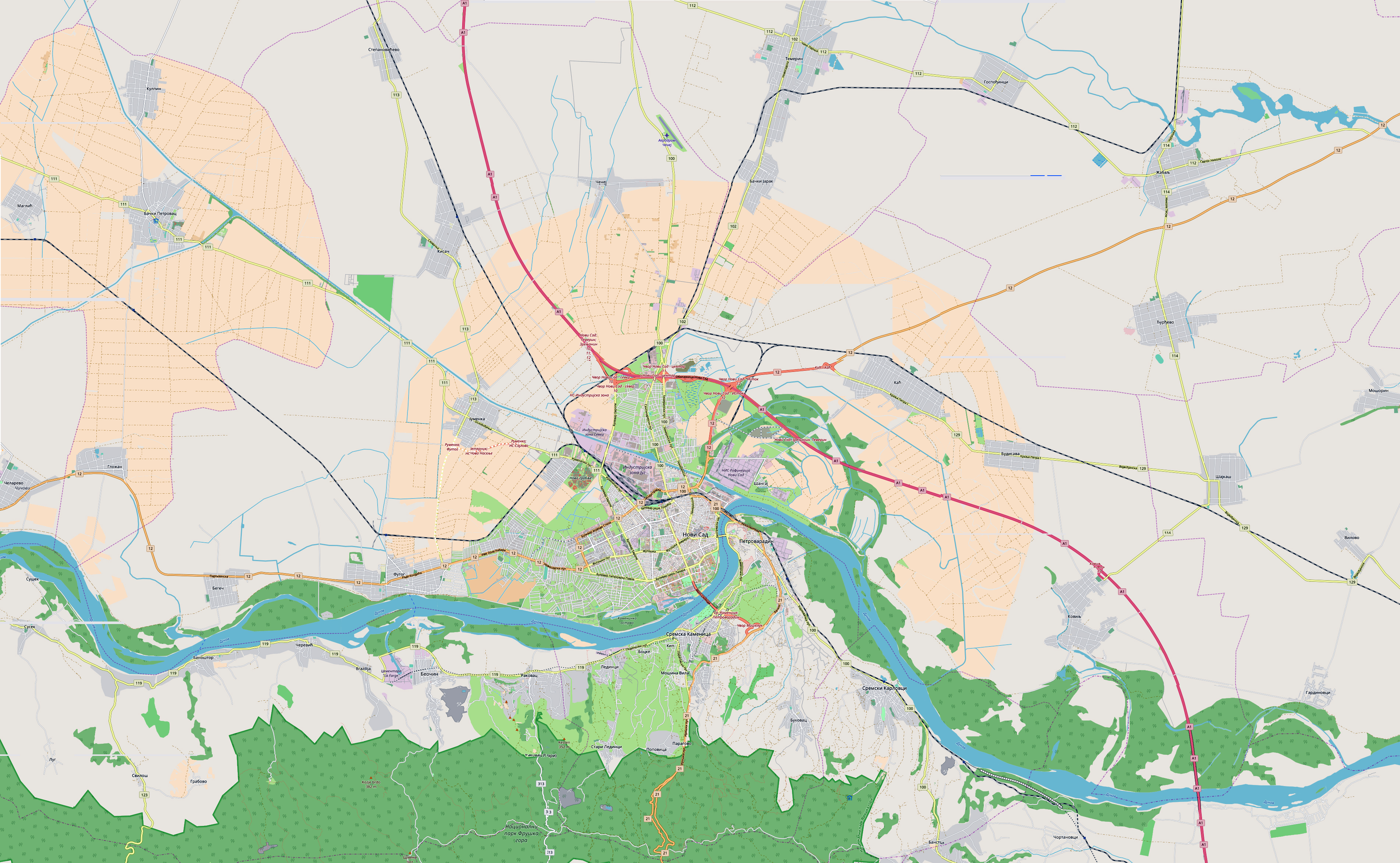
- Location in Serbia Stari Ledinci (Vojvodina) Stari Ledinci (Serbia)
- Coordinates: 45°12′39″N 19°48′13″E
- Country: Serbia
- Province: Vojvodina
- District: South Bačka
- Municipality: Petrovaradin

Area
  - Total: 11.08 km^{2} (4.28 sq mi)

Population (2011)
  - Total: 934
- Time zone: UTC+1
- Area code: + 381(0)21

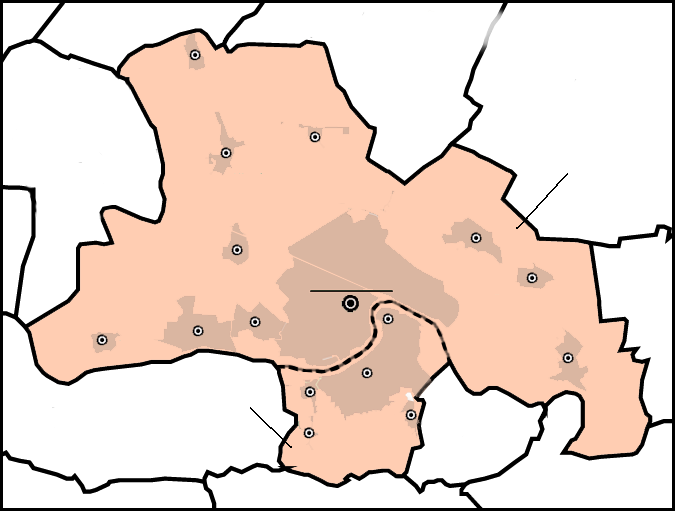

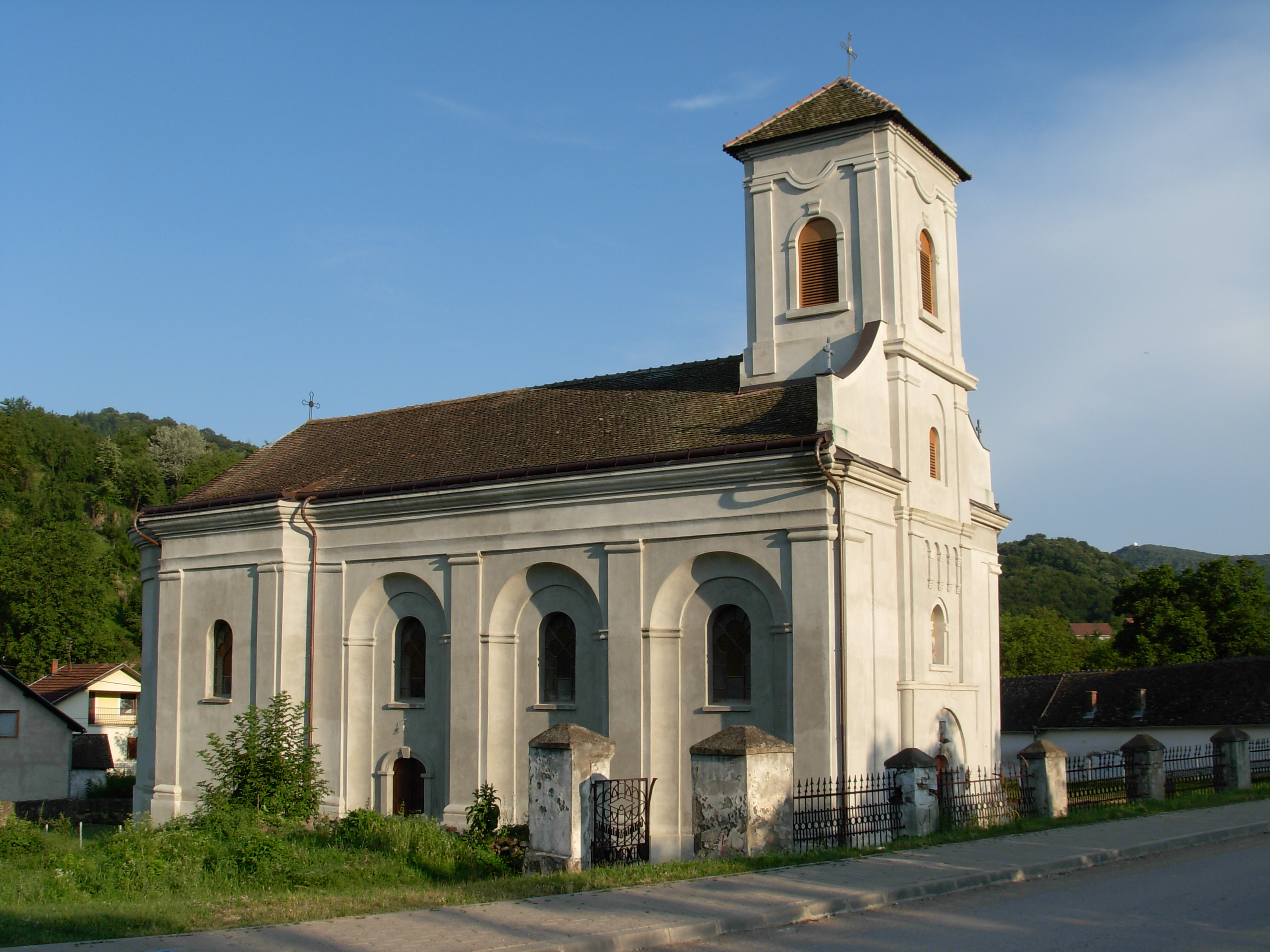
Orthodox church in Stari Ledinci

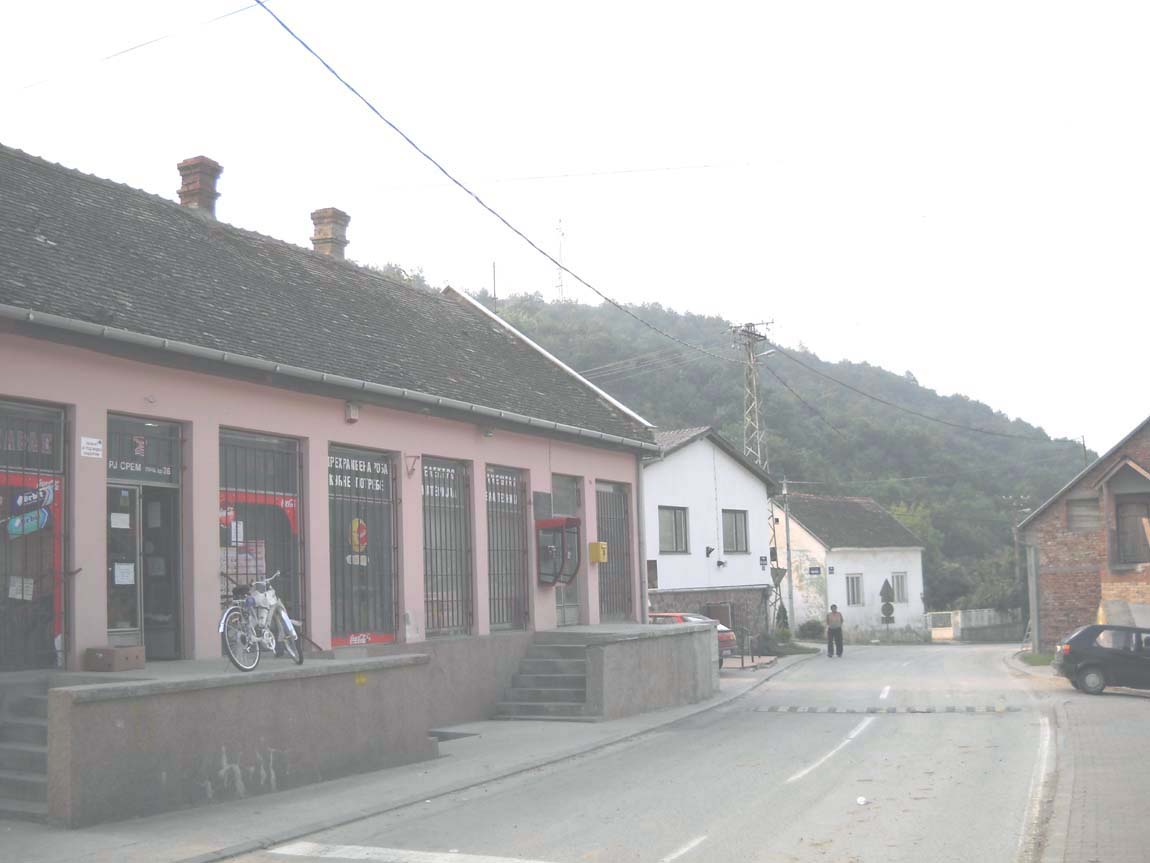
Center of the village

Stari Ledinci (Serbian Cyrillic: Стари Лединци) also known simply as Ledinci (Serbian Cyrillic: Лединци) is a suburban settlement of Petrovaradin, Novi Sad, Serbia.

== Geography ==
The village is geographically located in Srem, but it is part of South Bačka District. There are two villages with this name: Stari Ledinci (Old Ledinci) and Novi Ledinci (New Ledinci). Today, the name "Ledinci" is officially used to designate Novi Ledinci, while other village is officially known as Stari Ledinci. Both villages are located in Petrovaradin municipality, on the brows of Fruška Gora mountain. Near the village of Stari Ledinci lies a Ledinci Lake, which is an important tourist destination.

== History ==
The village was probably founded in the 13th century, during the administration of the Kingdom of Hungary . According to a record from 1372, the area near Ledinci was named "a Serb region", while according to the record from 1438, this territory was inhabited by "Schismatics" (Orthodox Christians).

According to the legend, the village of Ledinci was among the possessions of the Serbian despot Jovan Branković (1496–1502), who donated this village to the Rakovac Monastery. The ethnic Serb inhabitants of this part of Srem are also mentioned during the uprising of György Dózsa in 1514.

During the Ottoman rule, in the 17th century, a master of the village was Solak Mehmed-aga, an Ottoman spahija. Since the end of the 17th century, the village was under the administration of the Habsburg monarchy. The Habsburg authorities had problems with collecting taxes in the village, since, according to one tax report from the first half of the 18th century, the inhabitants of this region were Freie Ratzen ("free Serbs"), by the character very disobedient and defiant. They continually avoiding the contacts with the representatives of the authorities, thus it is very hard to deal with them".

Since 1918, the village was part of the Kingdom of Serbs, Croats and Slovenes. During the Second World War, the village was burned to the ground by the German fascists. After the war, the village was rebuilt, but on the new location, near the river Danube, and today this village is known as Novi Ledinci (New Ledinci). However, part of the population returned to the old location of the village, so the old village was rebuilt too, and today is known as Stari Ledinci (Old Ledinci).

== Demographics ==
Historical population
Year	Pop.	±%
1948	233	—
1953	267	+14.6%
1961	338	+26.6%
1971	399	+18.0%
1981	570	+42.9%
1991	642	+12.6%
2001	823	+28.2%
2011	934	+13.5%
Source: Census

== Gallery ==
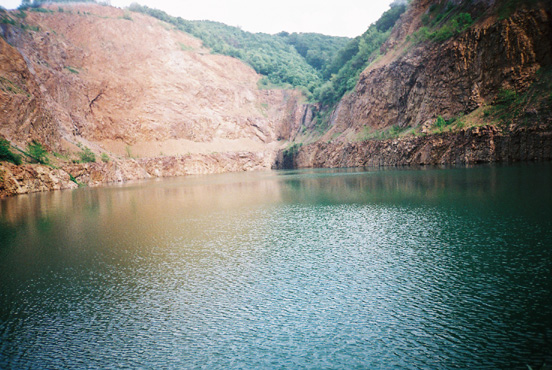
Ledinci Lake

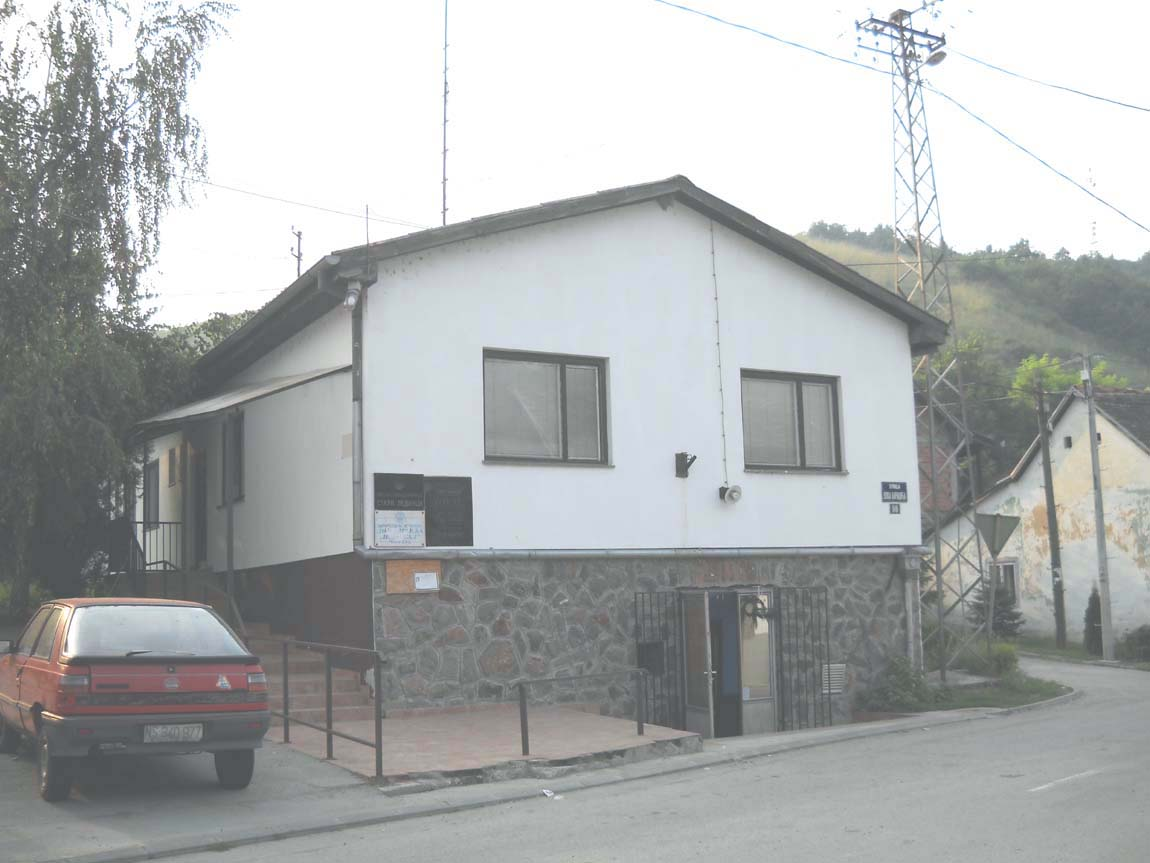
Local community office and health station

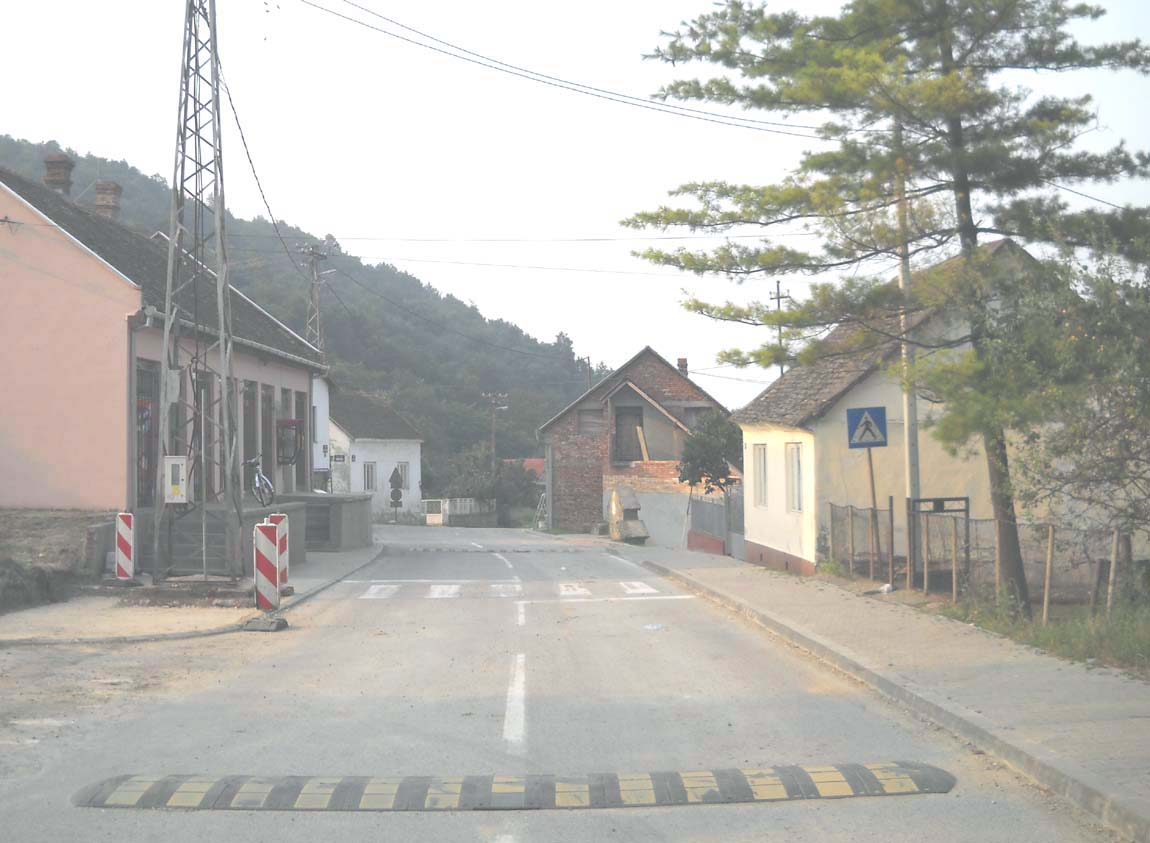
Center of the village

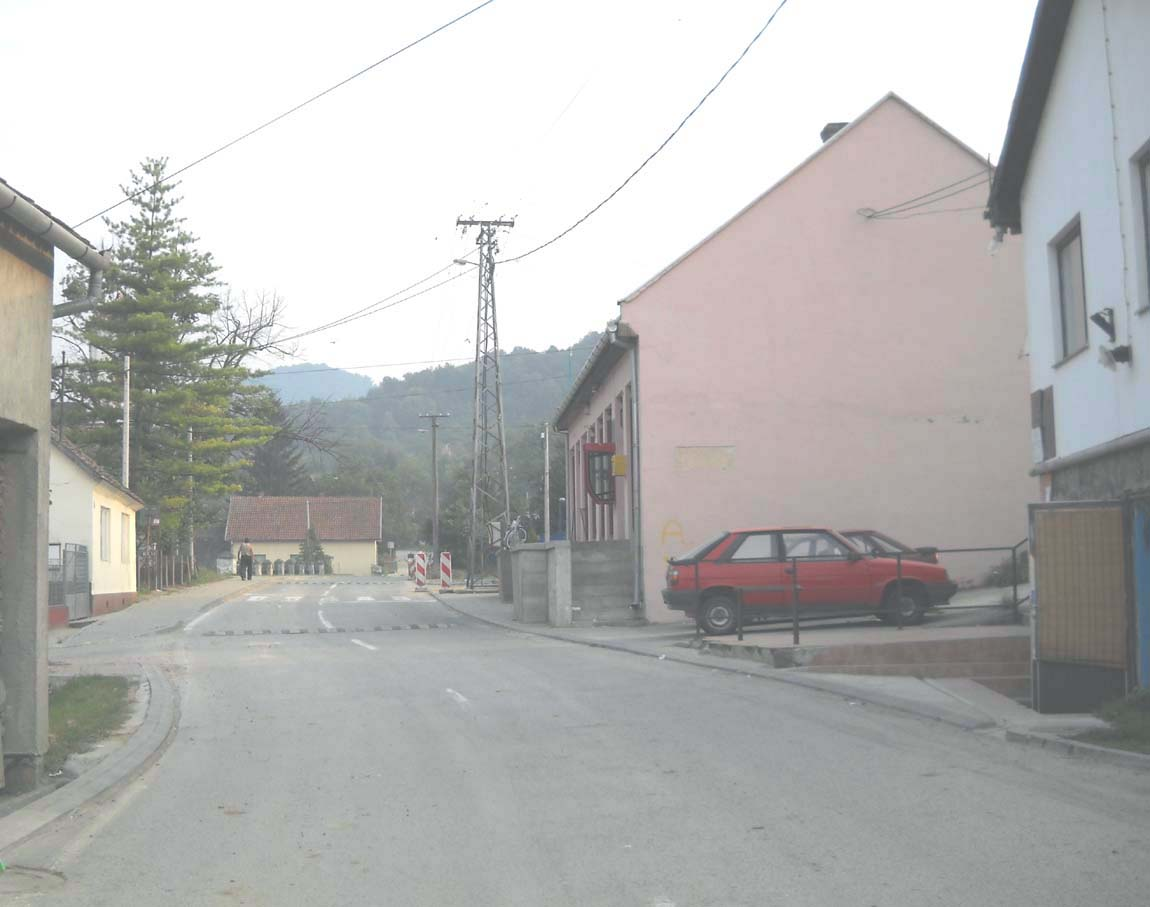
Center of the village

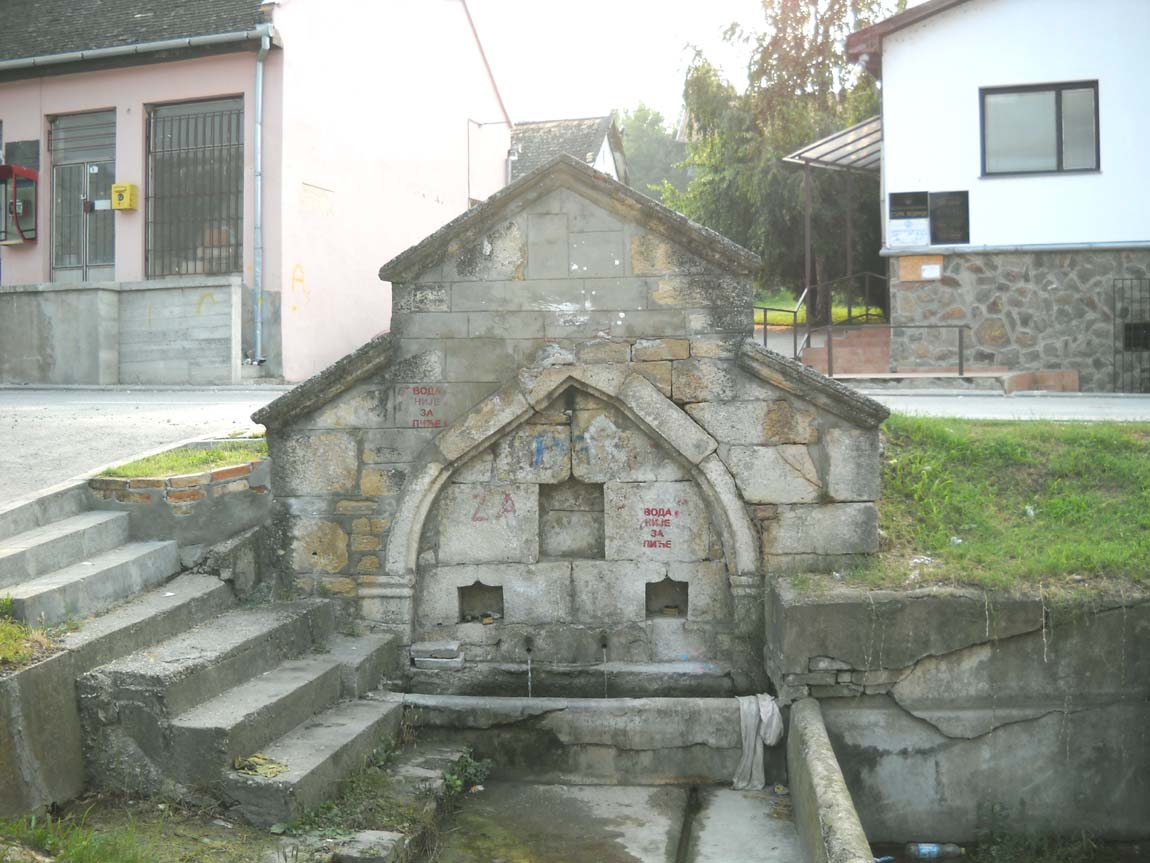
Turkish well

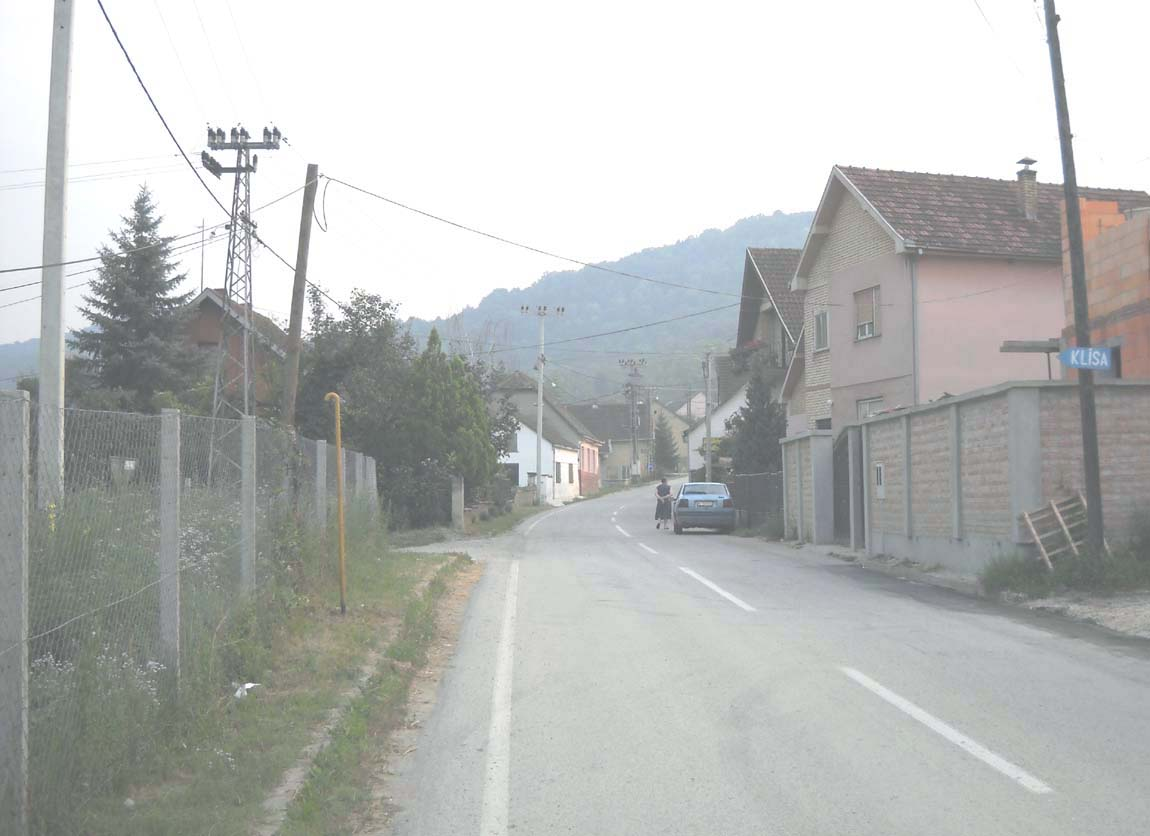
Street in the village

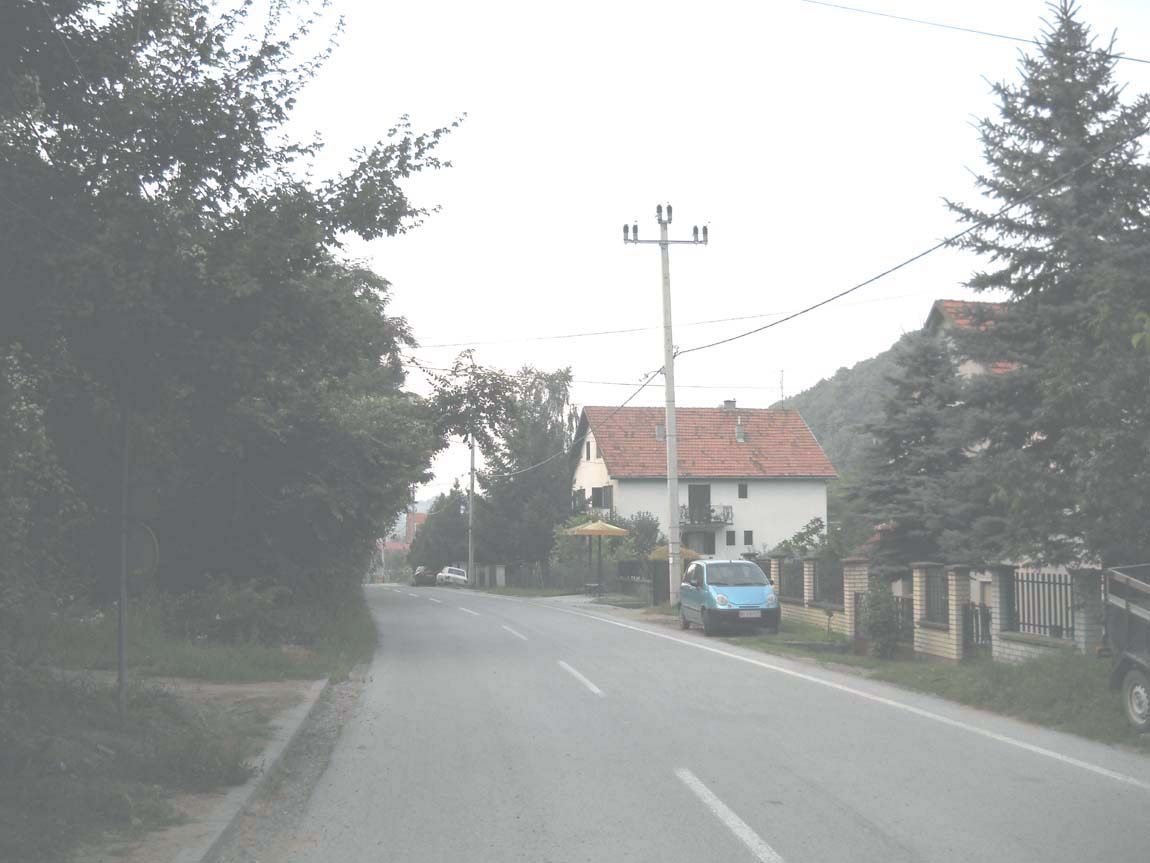
Street in the village

== See also ==
- Novi Ledinci
- Ledinci Lake
- Fruška Gora
- List of places in Serbia
- List of cities, towns and villages in Vojvodina
