= Kamenjar =

Kamenjar Камењар
- Suburban settlement
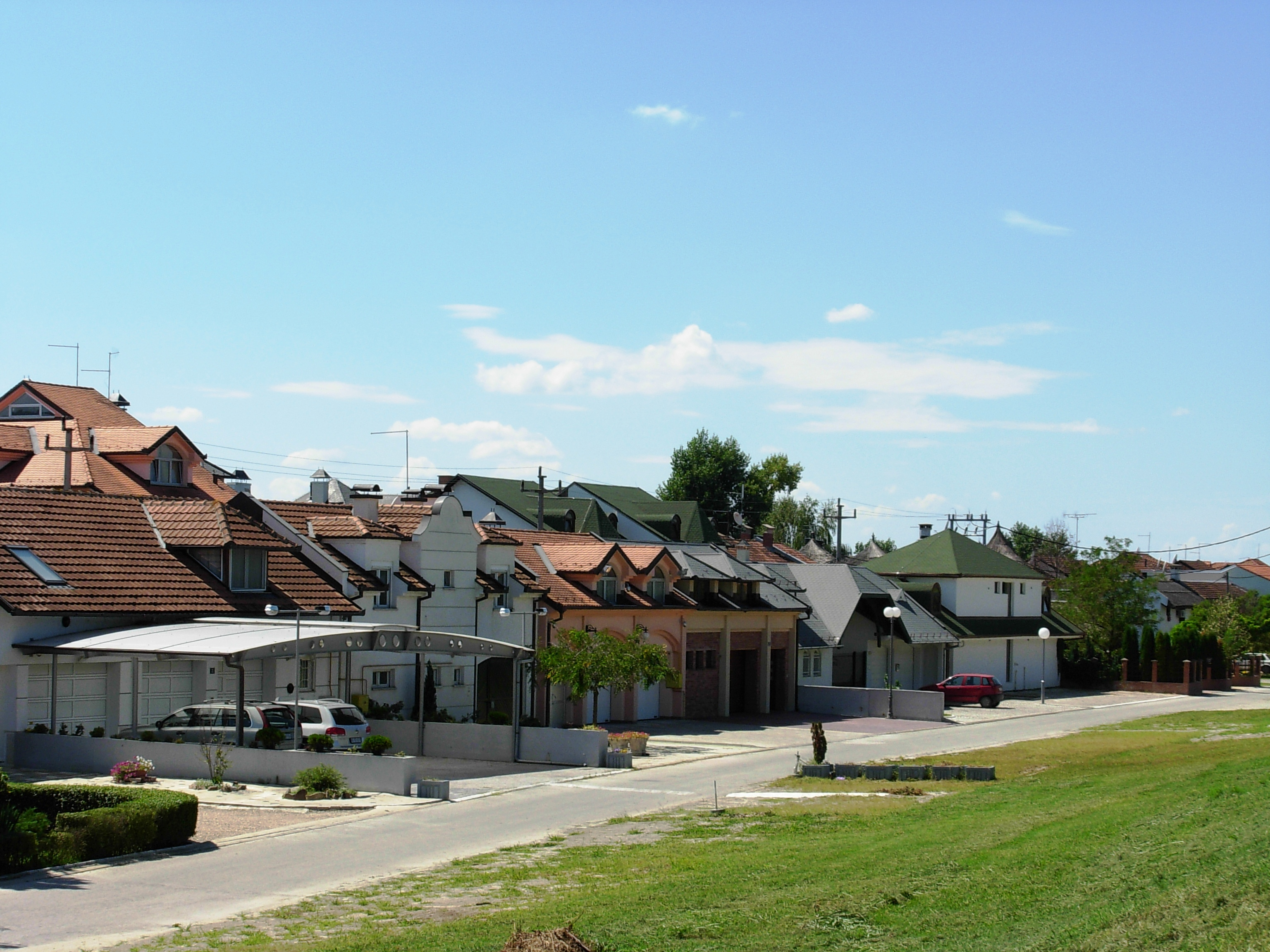

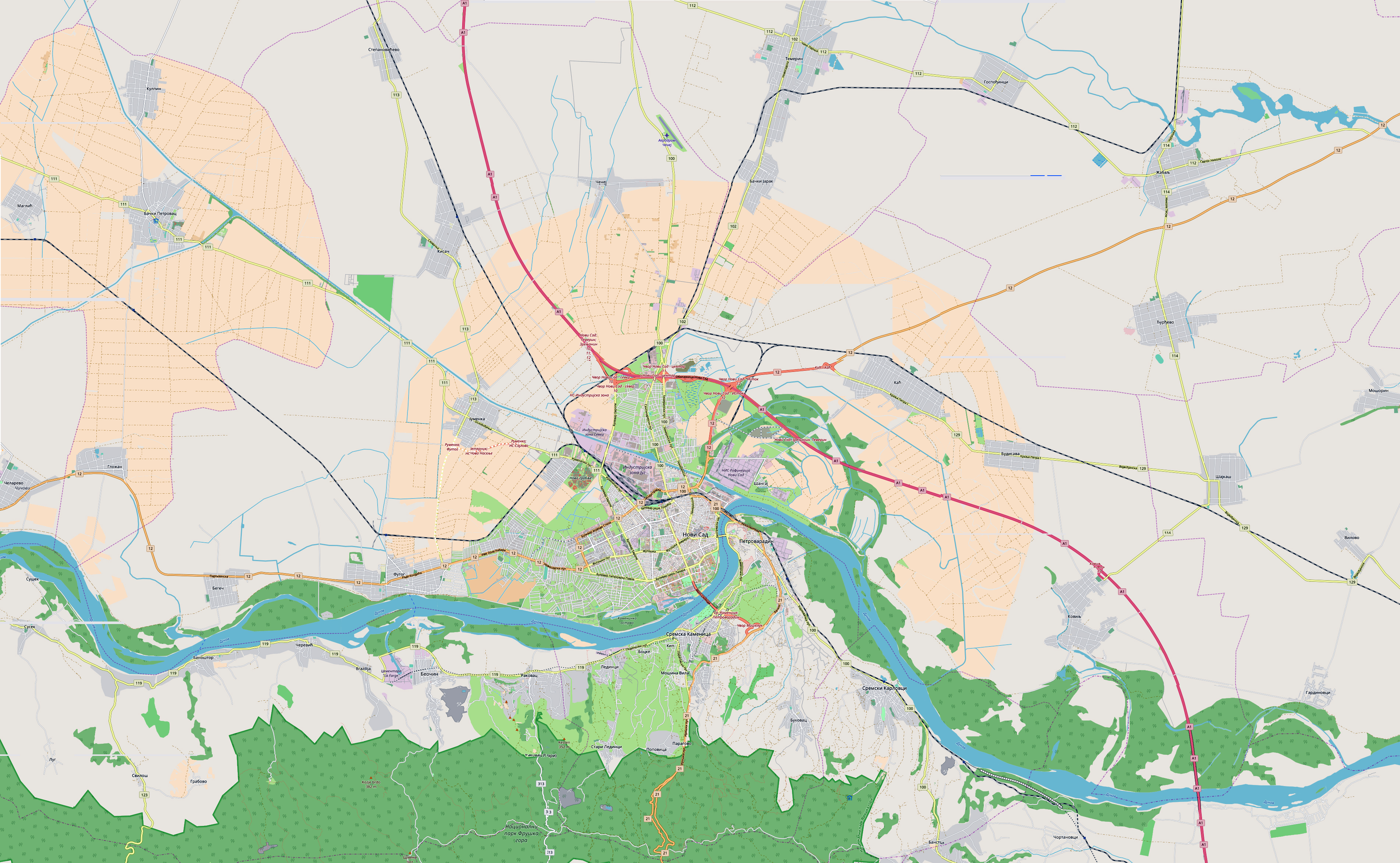
- Location within Novi Sad
- Coordinates: 45.2289°N 19.7744°E
- Country: Serbia
- Province: Vojvodina
- District: South Bačka
- Municipality: Novi Sad
- Time zone: UTC+1 (CET)
  - Summer (DST): UTC+2 (CEST)

Kamenjar (Serbian Cyrillic: Камењар) is a suburban settlement of the city of Novi Sad, Serbia. It is located between river Danube in the south-west, Adice in the north and Kameničko Ostrvo in the east.
