= Adice =

Urban neighborhood in Vojvodina, Serbia

Adice Адице
- Urban neighborhood
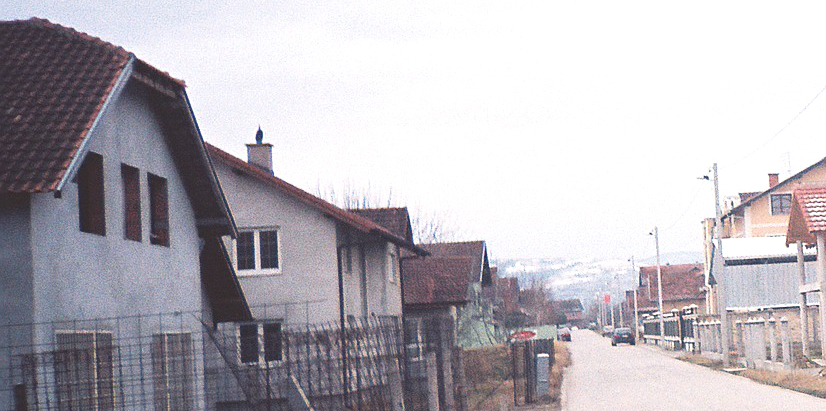
- Adice
- Interactive map of Adice
- Country: Serbia
- Province: Vojvodina
- District: South Bačka
- Municipality: Novi Sad

Area
  - Total: 2.99 km^{2} (1.15 sq mi)
- Time zone: UTC+1 (CET)
  - Summer (DST): UTC+2 (CEST)
- Area code: +381(0)21
- Car plates: NS

Adice (Serbian: Адице) is an urban neighborhood belonging to the city of Novi Sad, Serbia.

== Borders ==
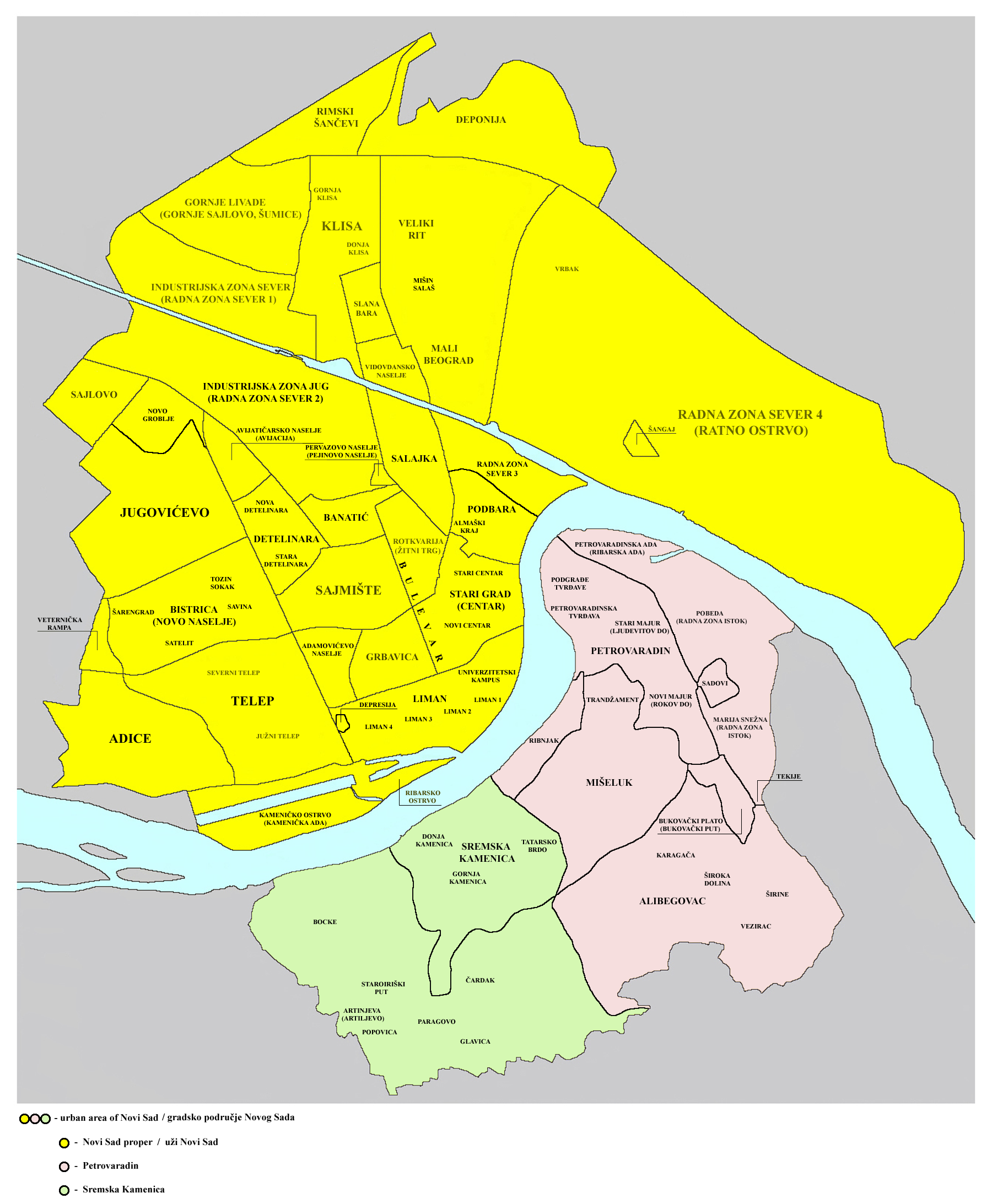
Map of the urban area of Novi Sad with city quarters, showing the location of Adice

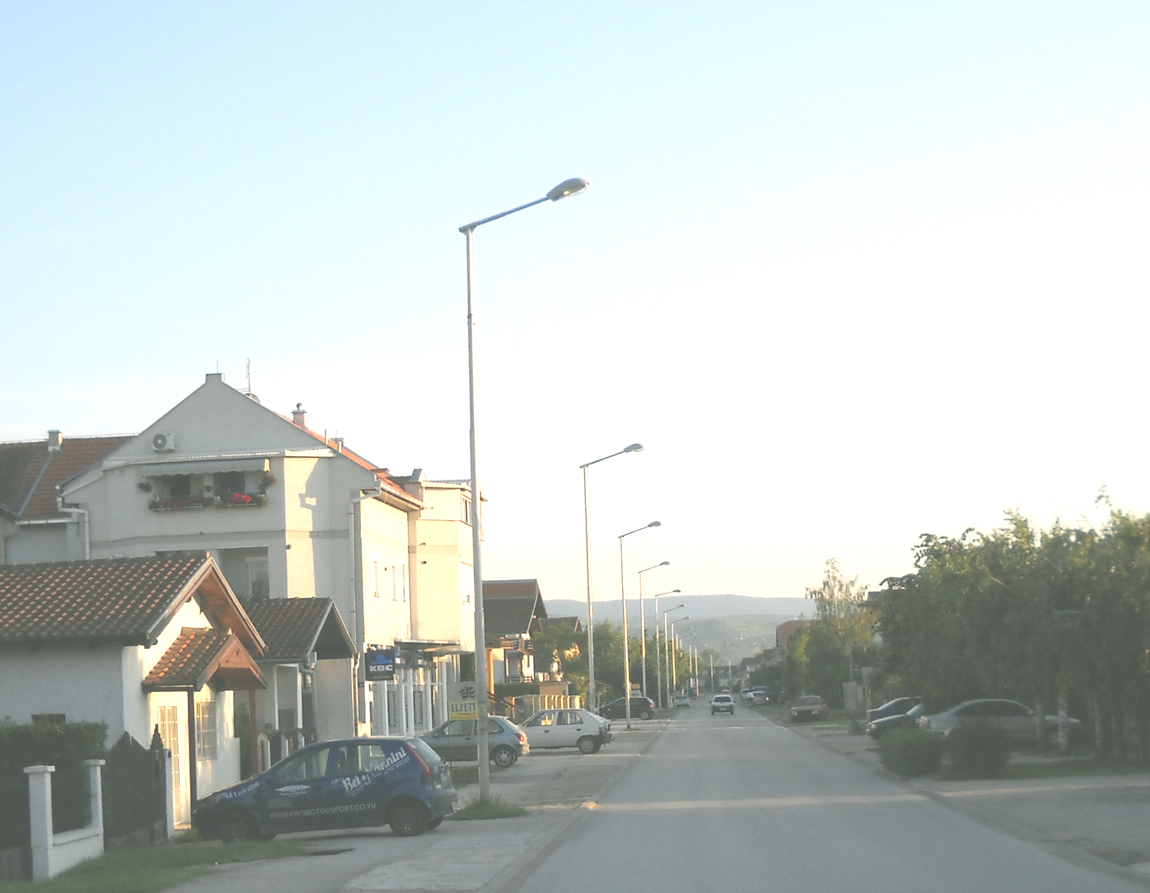
Adice

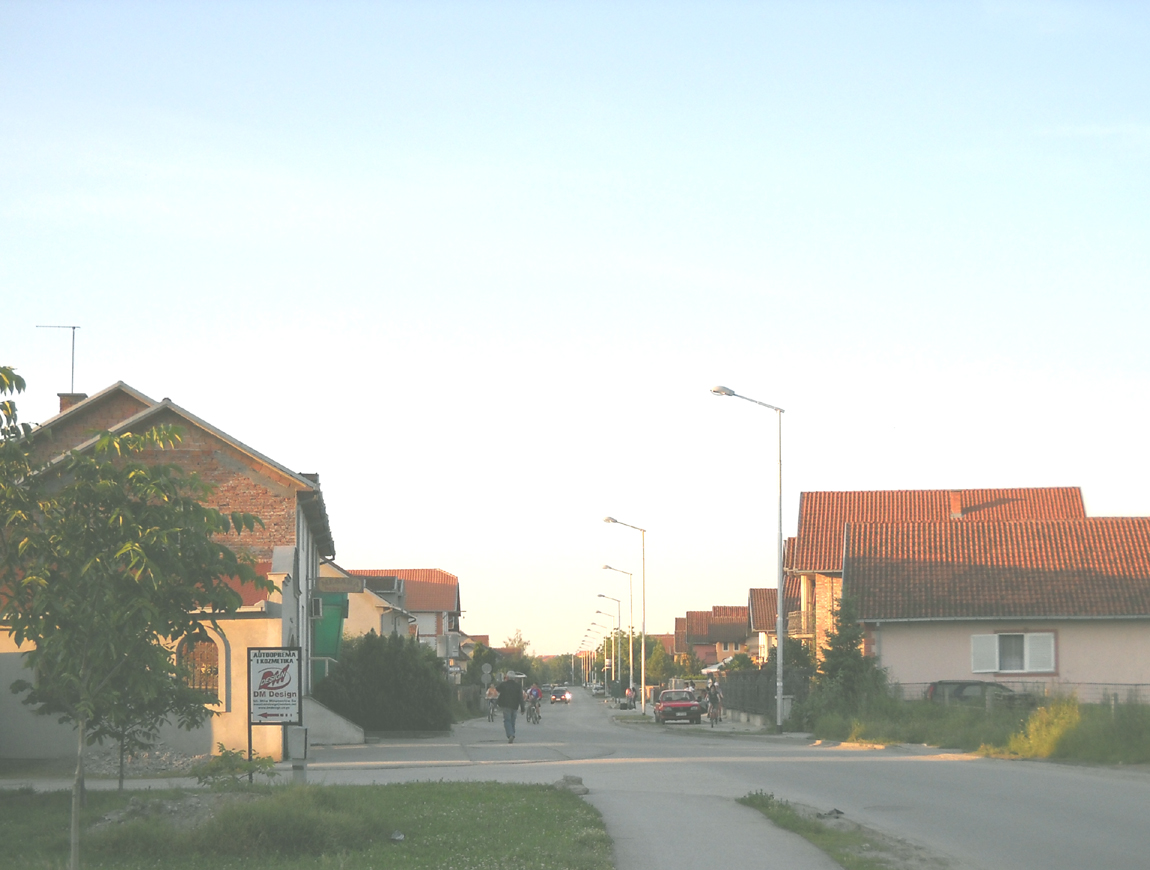
Adice

The southern border of Adice is Podunavska ulica (Podunavska Street), the eastern border is Šumska ulica (Šumska Street), the northern border is Novosadski put (Novi Sad Road), and the western border is a western city limit of Novi Sad.

== Neighbouring city quarters ==
The neighbouring city quarters and settlements are: Telep in the east, Veternička Rampa in the north, Veternik in the west, and Kamenjar in the south.

== Population ==
Population of the Adice neighborhood is ethnically diverse and includes Serbs, a sizable Romani community, as well as members of other ethnic groups.

== Features ==
There is a hotel named "Adice" in the main street of the settlement.

A festival, called "Danube nights of Adice" is held annually in September.

== See also ==
- Neighborhoods of Novi Sad
