= Veternička Rampa =

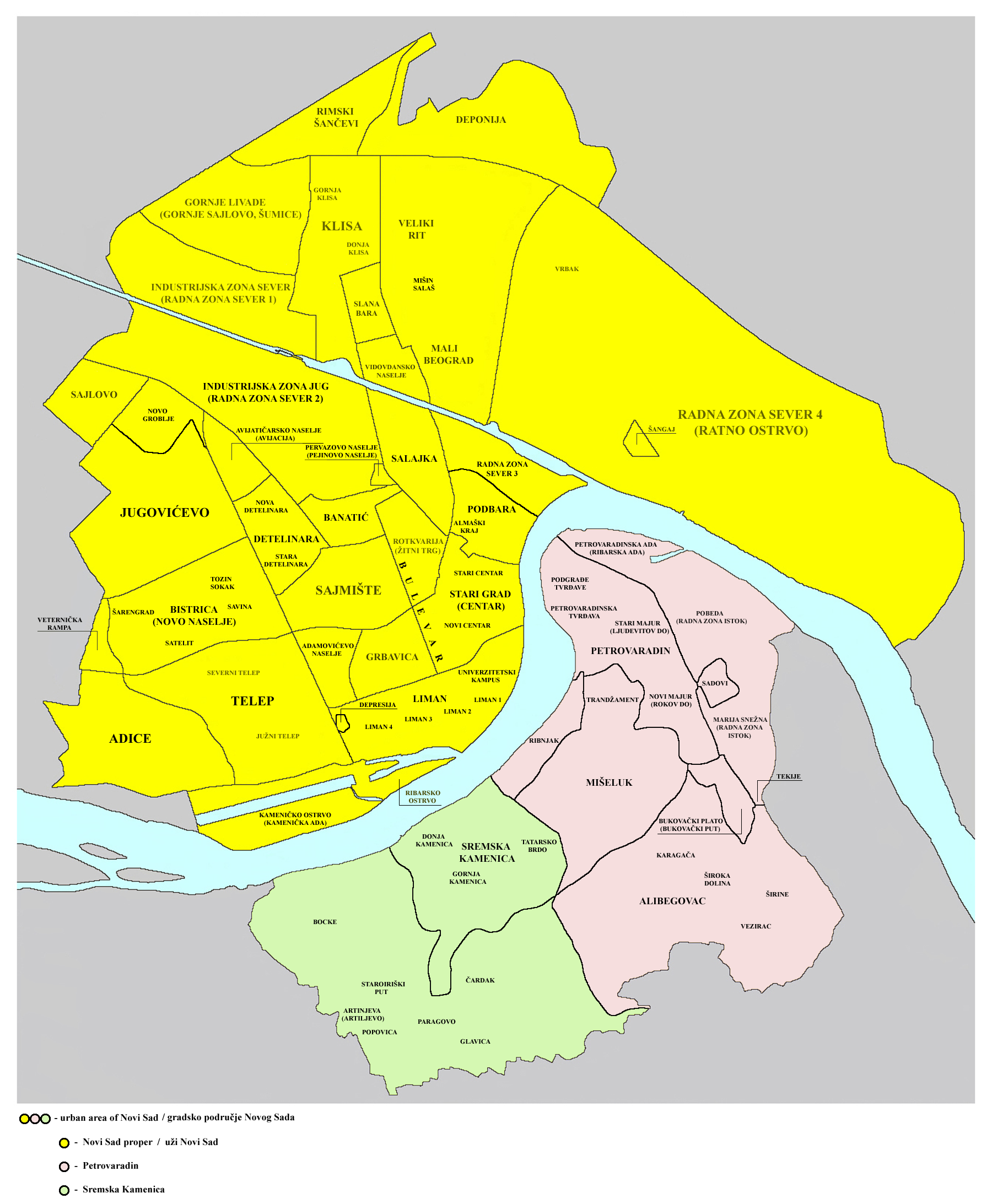
Map of the urban area of Novi Sad with city quarters, showing the location of Veternička Rampa

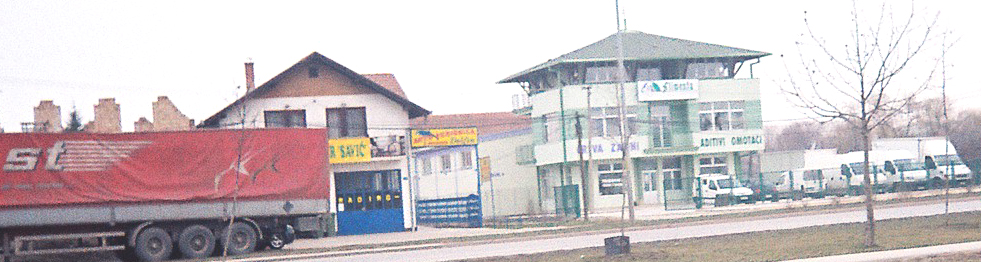
Veternička Rampa

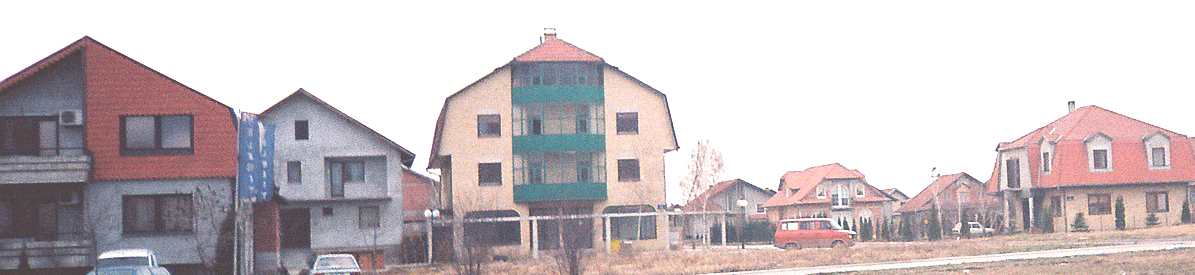
Veternička Rampa

Veternička Rampa (Serbian: Ветерничка Рампа) is an urban neighborhood of the city of Novi Sad, Serbia.

== Borders ==
The southern border of Veternička Rampa is Novosadski put (Novi Sad Road), the eastern border is Ulica Somborska rampa (Somborska Rampa Street), the northern border is a prolongation of the Bulevar Vojvode Stepe (Vojvoda Stepa Boulevard), and the western border is a western city limit of Novi Sad.

== Neighbouring settlements ==
The neighbouring settlements are: Novo Naselje in the east, Adice in the south, Jugovićevo in the north, and Veternik in the west.

== History ==
Veternička Rampa was settled during the 1990s by the Serb refugees from Bosnia and Croatia.

== See also ==
- Neighborhoods of Novi Sad
