= Nikolajevska Church, Novi Sad =

Church building in Novi Sad, Serbia

Nikolajevska Church
- Николајевска црква
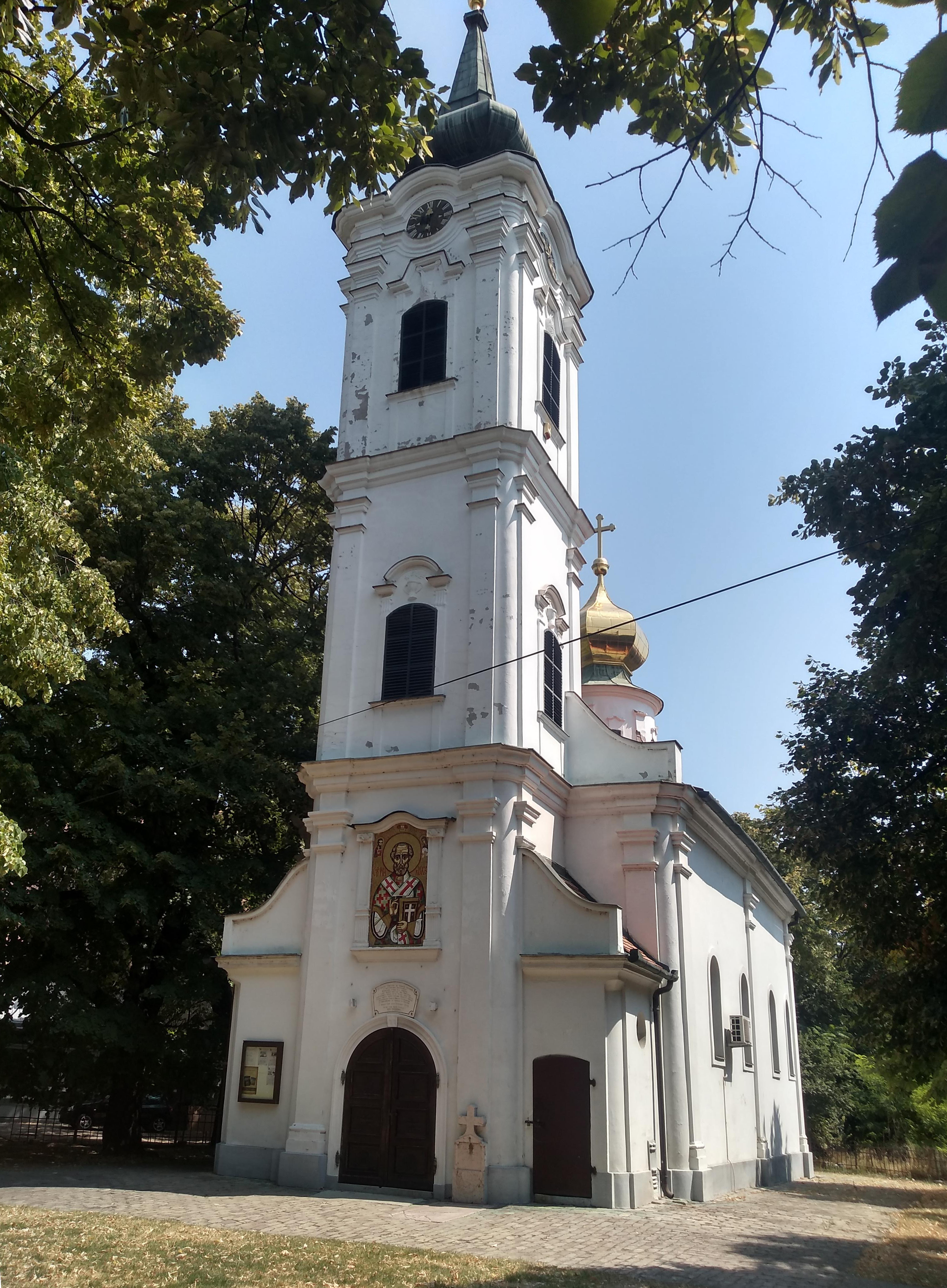
- Nikolajevska Church in Novi Sad

Religion
- Affiliation: Serbian Orthodox Church
- Rite: Eastern Orthodox
- Ecclesiastical or organisational status: Parish church
- Status: Active

Location
- Location: Novi Sad, Vojvodina, Serbia
- Interactive map of Nikolajevska Church
- Coordinates: 45.258837°N 19.844393°E

Architecture
- Completed: 1729–1730
- Direction of façade: West

Nikolajevska Church (Николајевска црква), officially the Serbian Orthodox Church of the Translation of the Relics of Saint Nicholas (Српска православна црква Преноса моштију Светог Николе), is an 18th-century Serbian Orthodox church in Novi Sad, Serbia. It is widely regarded as the oldest surviving Orthodox church in the city, with its earliest documented mention connected to its consecration in 1730. The church is a protected cultural monument of Serbia and is listed as an Immovable Cultural Heritage of Great Importance.

== History ==
The church was built in the first half of the 18th century, most commonly dated to the period between 1726 and 1730, in the settlement then known as Petrovaradinski Šanac, which later developed into modern Novi Sad.

During the 1848–1849 revolutions in the Habsburg Monarchy, Novi Sad suffered extensive destruction during the bombardment of 12 June 1849. Nikolajevska Church was severely damaged, and much of its earlier interior decoration was lost.

The church was restored in the early 1860s with the financial support of prominent Novi Sad benefactors Marija Trandafil and Jovan Trandafil. Members of the Trandafil family, including Marija and her children Sofija and Kosta, are buried within the church.

According to local historical tradition promoted by the Tourist Organisation of Novi Sad, the sons of Albert Einstein, Hans Albert and Eduard, were baptized in this church in 1913 while staying with the family of Mileva Marić in Novi Sad.

== Architecture ==
Nikolajevska Church is a modest single-nave structure built in the Baroque style, reflecting Central European architectural influences common in Serbian Orthodox churches constructed under Habsburg rule. The western façade is dominated by a tall bell tower, while a small decorative dome rises above the nave. The exterior is articulated with pilasters and profiled cornices characteristic of 18th-century Baroque ecclesiastical architecture.

== Interior and art ==
The iconostasis was painted by the Novi Sad artist Pavle Simić (1818–1876), whose work shows stylistic affinities with the Nazarene movement. The iconostasis is considered one of the most significant 19th-century ecclesiastical artworks in Novi Sad.

Wall paintings inside the church are attributed to several artists, including Dimitrije Petrović Kerefeka, Nikola Dimšić, and Živko Petrović, reflecting multiple phases of interior decoration following the mid-19th-century restoration.

== Protection status ==
The iconostasis was placed under state protection in 1948, and the church building itself was designated a cultural monument in 1959. In 1991, Nikolajevska Church was officially classified as an Immovable Cultural Heritage of Great Importance of the Republic of Serbia, under registry designation SK 1109.

== See also ==
- Religious architecture in Novi Sad
