= Marija Trandafil =

Serbian philanthropist

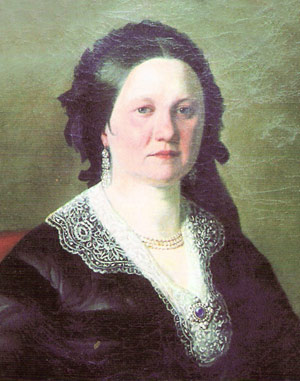
- Born: Marija Popović; 25 December 1816; Novi Sad, Austrian Empire
- Died: 14 October 1883 (aged 66); Novi Sad, Austria-Hungary
- Occupation: Landowner
- Known for: Philanthropy
- Spouse: Jovan Trandafil

Marija Trandafil or Marija Popović (25 December 1816 – 14 October 1883) was a Serbian philanthropist in the city of Novi Sad. She and her husband helped the city of Novi Sad to rebuild after it was bombarded in the 1848 Hungarian Revolution. She rebuilt a fortune and left her wealth to help children get an education, hospitals to be funded, pensions to be paid, and a new orphanage.

== Life ==
Trandafil was born in Novi Sad in 1813. Her father dealt in furs and married twice. His first wife Tajčić was Trandafil's mother. Her father married again, but he died at the age of 27 leaving the care of his daughter to his cousins. All of her siblings had died early so she was the heiress.

She was educated and fluent in German. She was married at age sixteen, by her guardian, Hadži Kira, to Jovan Trandafil. The marriage was so arranged that they never asked her opinion on her new husband. She married Jovan in Oseka (Osijek), on 31 January 1831 at the Church of St Peter and St Paul.

She and her new husband had several children, but none lived to become an adult and an heir. Their business in trading cloth did thrive, after the dowry brought to the wedding was used to start an enterprise. Jovan paid to become a citizen of Novi Sad and the profits were invested there in the property.

1848 saw the start of the Hungarian Revolution that was led by Lajos Kossuth and the city of Novi Sad paid a high price. Only 800 of the 2,800 buildings were standing after the bombardment by the Hungarian army. She later recalled that in 1849 she had spent her only day of hunger as she waited outside the closed walls of Varadin. This day was to shape her later plans. She and her husband paid for the rebuilding of Church of St. Nicholas (Nikolajevska Church), the oldest church in Novi Sad, dating back from 1730. She and her husband also paid for the city's Armenian Church to be rebuilt.

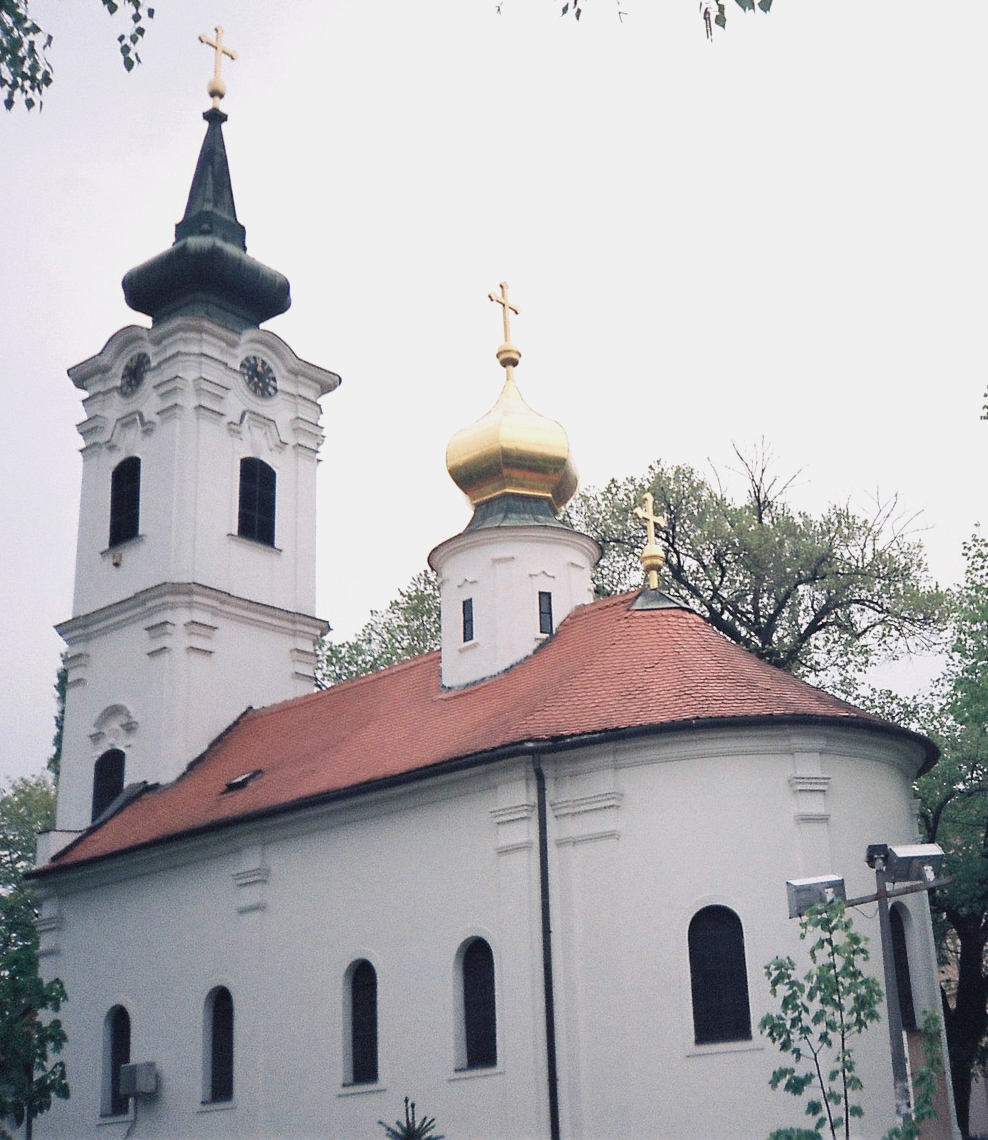
The Church of St. Nicholas in Novi Sad

In 1851 and 1852, her husband took on large loans to recreate their business. Trandafil and her husband created a will that left the money to charity and her on 24 June 1860. In 1862, her husband died. He was buried alongside their children Sofija and Kosta at Nikolajevska Church, and she spent time with lawyers defending the inheritance he had left to her. There were four independent claims, but she resisted them all. Meanwhile, she continued the business and created more wealth.

== Legacy ==
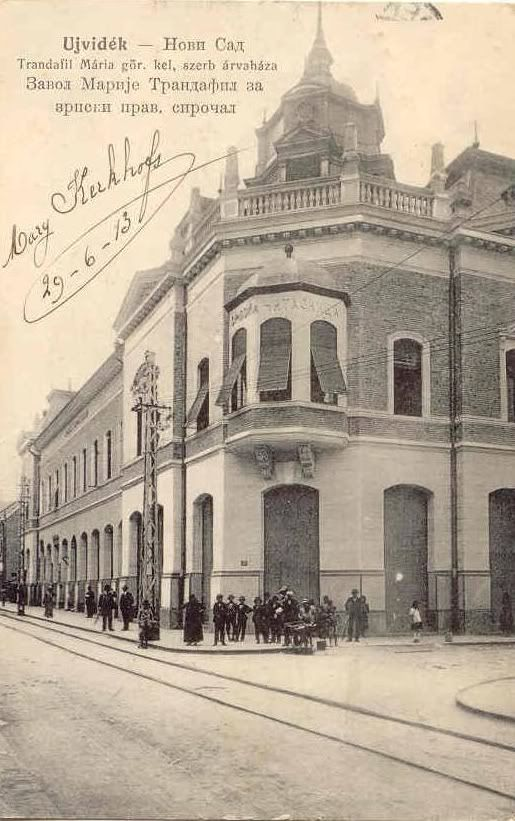
The orphanage created by Maria Trandafil in Novi Sad (photo in 1913)

On 9 September 1878, she made her own will leaving 470 acres of land to create a fund to educate the poor. Thirty scholarships would send poor students to the local Gymnasium school and the income from other property was used to fund the marriages of two poor girls every year and another fund was given to local hospitals and another to poor men or widows. She died in her home city in 1883, was buried in Nikolajevska Church, and her will came into force. Her greatest gift did not happen until 1908, when the large fund she had set aside for a new orphanage had grown to 300,000 forints. The new orphanage designed by Momčilo Tapavica opened in 1912 for male orphans at a cost of 500,000 forints. In 1928 the building was taken over by Matica Srpska.

A square in Novi Sad was named after Marija Trandafil in 2001. In 2009, the city of Novi Sad decided to build a new primary school in Veternik, which they named after Marija Trandafil.

== See also ==
- Sava Tekelija
- Miša Anastasijević
- Stanojlo Petrović
- Luka Ćelović
- Đorđe Vajfert
- Nikola Spasić
