= Novi Sad Synagogue =

Former synagogue in Novi Sad, Serbia

- Новосадска синагога Novosadska sinagoga
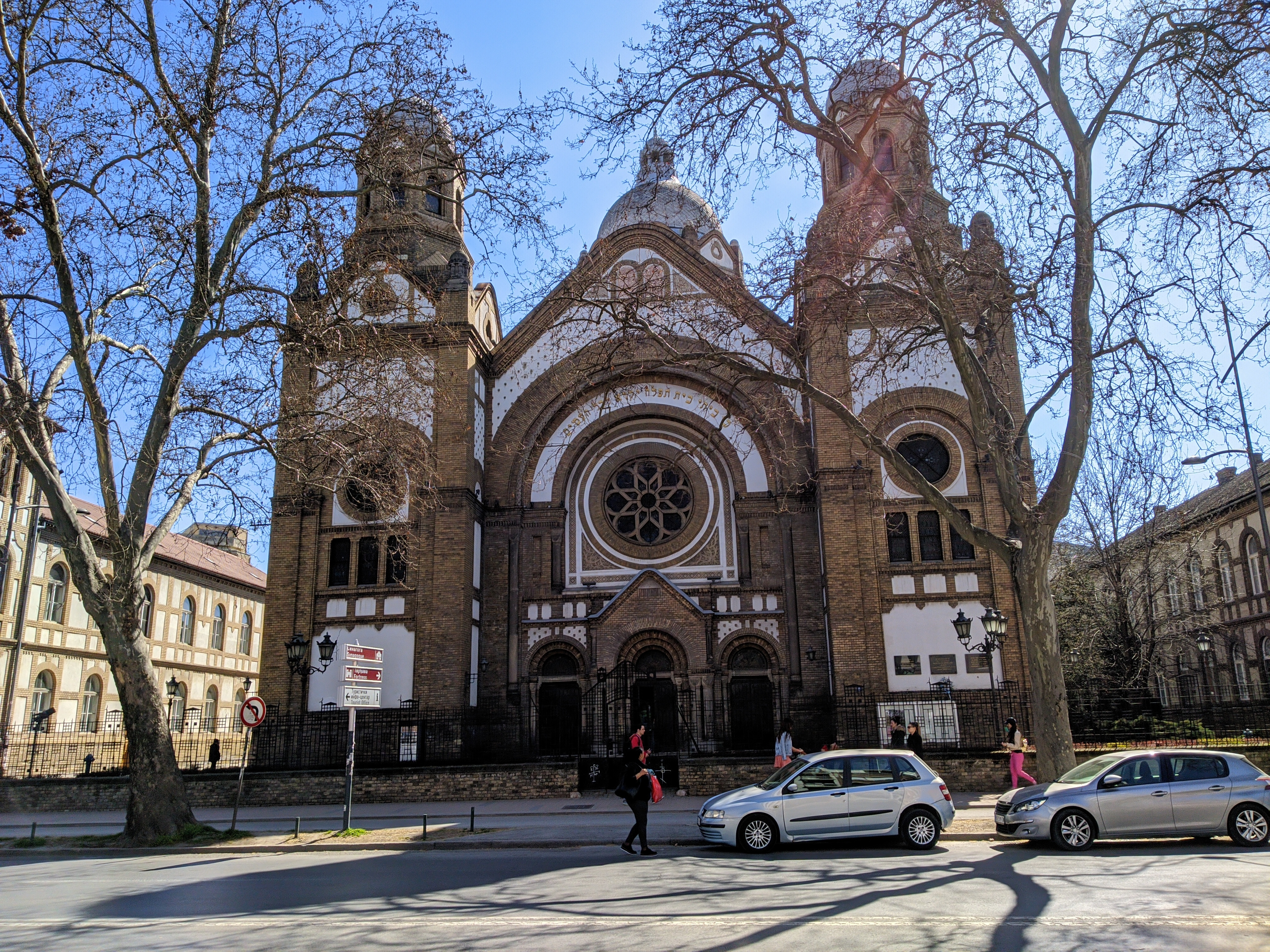
- Novi Sad Synagogue, pictured in 2022

Religion
- Affiliation: Neolog Judaism
- Rite: Nusach Ashkenaz
- Ecclesiastical or organisational status: Synagogue (1909–1966); Cultural center (2012–)
- Year consecrated: 1905, 1945
- Status: Closed (as a synagogue)

Location
- Location: Jevrejska 11, Novi Sad
- Country: Serbia
- Interactive map of Novi Sad Synagogue
- Coordinates: 45°15′11″N 19°50′27″E

Architecture
- Architect: Lipót Baumhorn
- Type: Synagogue architecture
- Style: Hungarian Secession; Hungarian Art Nouveau
- Established: c. 1717 (as a congregation)
- Completed: 1909

Specifications
- Capacity: 900 worshipers
- Length: 52 m (171 ft)
- Width: 25 m (82 ft)
- Height (max): 40 m (130 ft)
- Dome: One
- Dome height (outer): 40 m (130 ft)
- Dome dia. (outer): 12 m (39 ft)
- Spire: Two
- Spire height: 27 m (89 ft)
- Materials: Brick

Cultural Heritage of Serbia
- Type: Cultural Monument of Exceptional Importance
- Designated: 1983
- Reference no.: PKIC 45

The Novi Sad Synagogue (Serbian: Новосадска синагога, romanized: Novosadska sinagoga) is a former Neolog Jewish congregation and synagogue, located in downtown Novi Sad, Serbia. Completed in 1909, the building was used as a synagogue until 1966 and repurposed to a cultural center since 2012. With a capacity of 900 worshipers, the synagogue used to be one of the largest synagogues in Central Europe.

The Novi Sad Synagogue is national heritage site of great importance since 1983 and is protected by the state.

== History ==
On the site of the present building there were four synagogues from 1749 until 1906. As the Jewish community expanded, a new synagogue was constructed on the site of the former one. The fourth was an exception since it was destroyed during the Riot bombing in 1849. The first synagogue was not located on the site of the current edifice, but on Kralja Aleksandra Street, and dated to before 1717.

The current building became a major project for the entire Jewish community of Novi Sad. Construction began in 1905 and was completed in 1909. Designed by Hungarian architect Lipót Baumhorn, it formed part of a larger complex that included two similarly decorated buildings flanking the synagogue. One building served as the Jewish school, while the other housed the offices of the Jewish community, as well as a mikvah, slaughterhouse, retirement home, and orphanage.

More than 4,000 Jews lived in Novi Sad before the World War II, out of a total population of 80,000. Approximately 1,000 Jews from Novi Sad survived the Holocaust that followed the German invasion of Yugoslavia in 1941 and the annexation of Bačka region by Hungary.

In the 1940s Jews from Novi Sad were imprisoned in the synagogue before their deportation to Nazi death camps. The building was also used as a storehouse for furniture and other possessions left behind by the city's Jews. After the war, the building was reused as a synagogue until c. 1966.

After World War II and following the Yugoslav Wars from 1991 to 2001, many Jews moved to Israel or countries that offer more economic opportunities. The synagogue was partially renovated in the early 1990s. Since 2012, the former synagogue has been repurposed to a cultural venue and is being used for concerts and performances, as well as for the celebration of major Jewish holidays. As of 2023, the former synagogue was in need of significant repairs.

== Architecture ==
Designed in the eclectic Hungarian Secession and Hungarian Art Nouveau styles, the building combines medieval elements with those borrowed from Hungarian folk culture. The three-aisled main sanctuary space is topped by a 40-metre (130 ft) high Renaissance-inspired dome with stained glass in its cupola. Two fanciful towers flank the grandiose entrance façade, which features a large rose window under an arch.

== Gallery ==
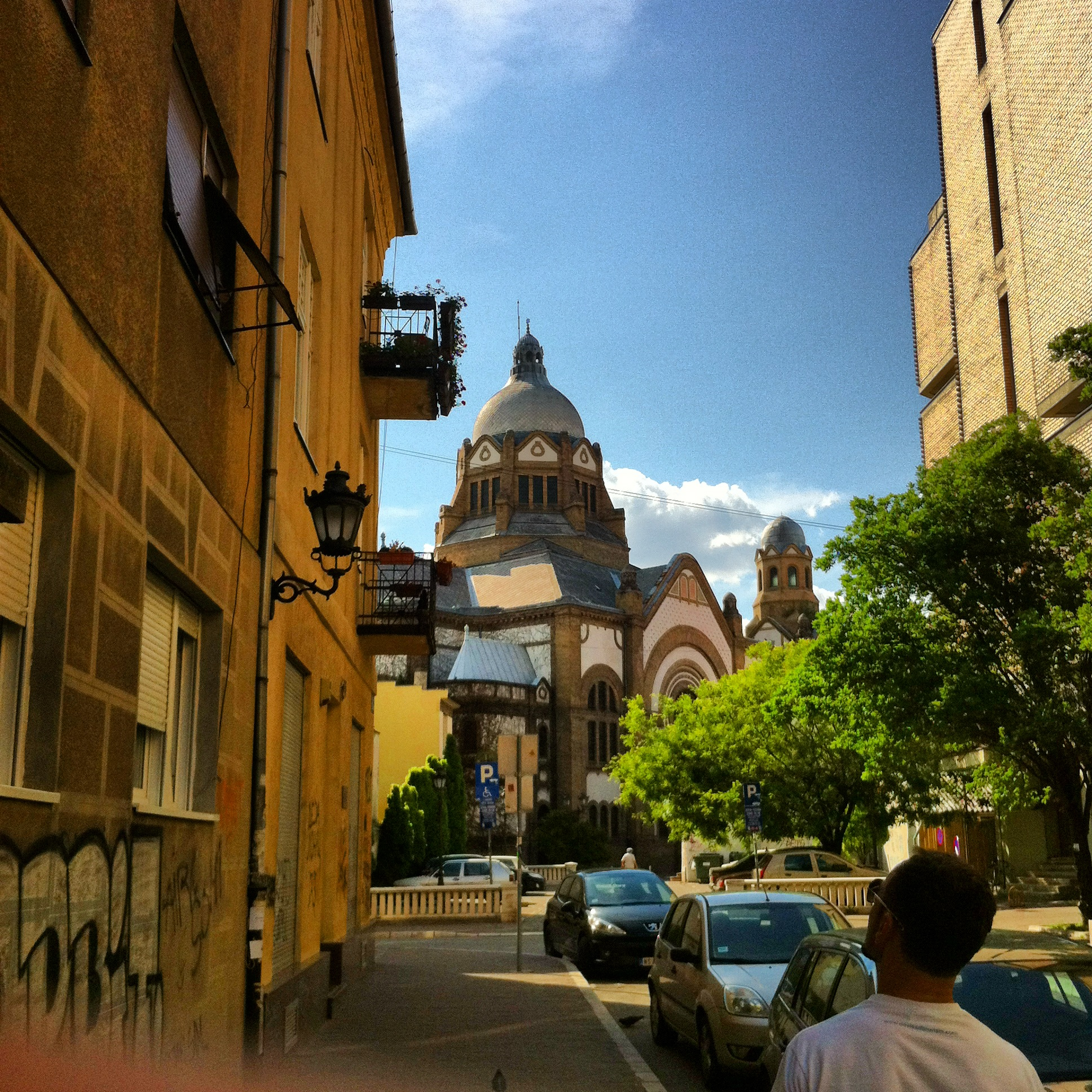
View from Petra Drapština Street

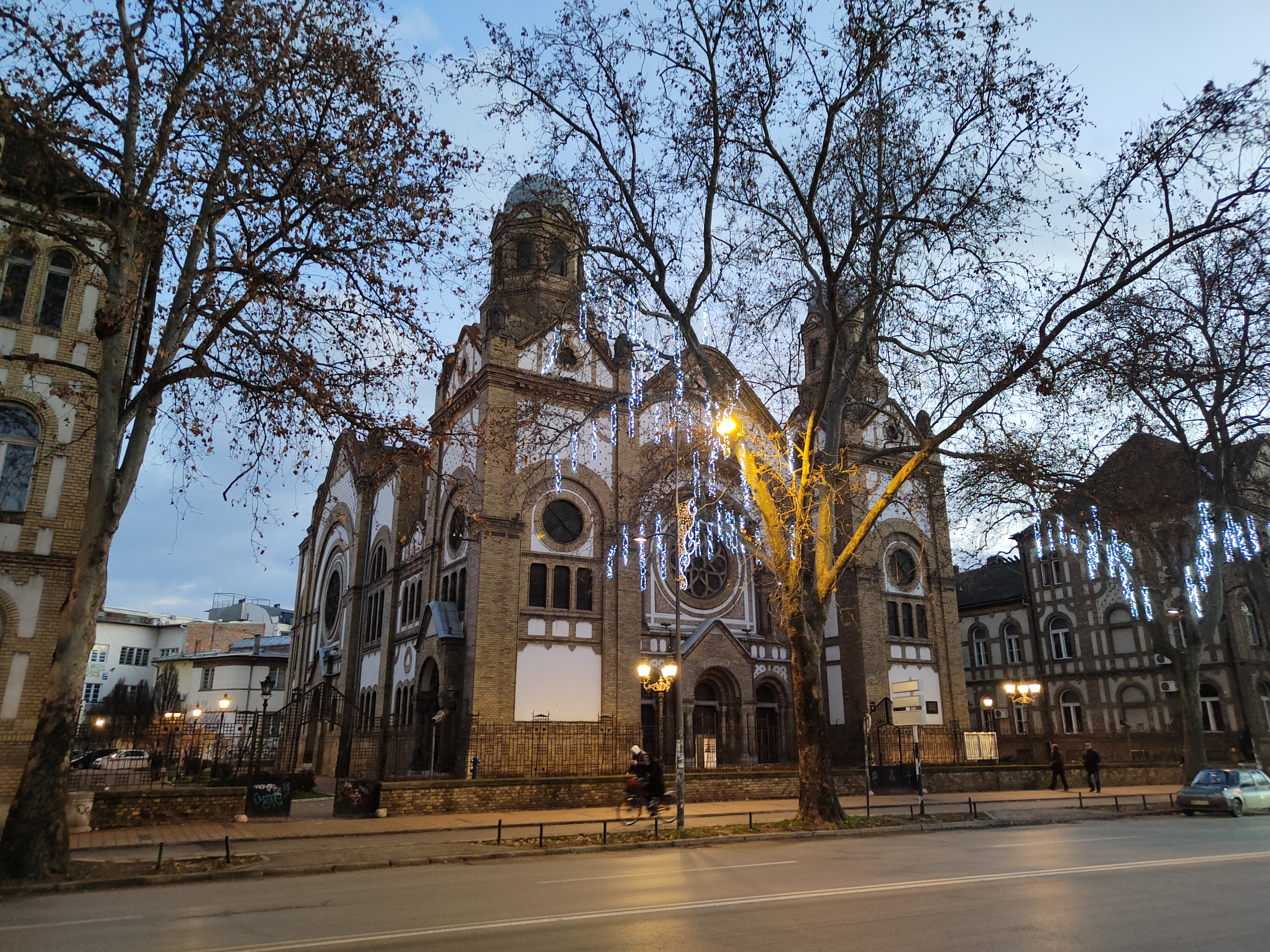
View from Jevrejska Street

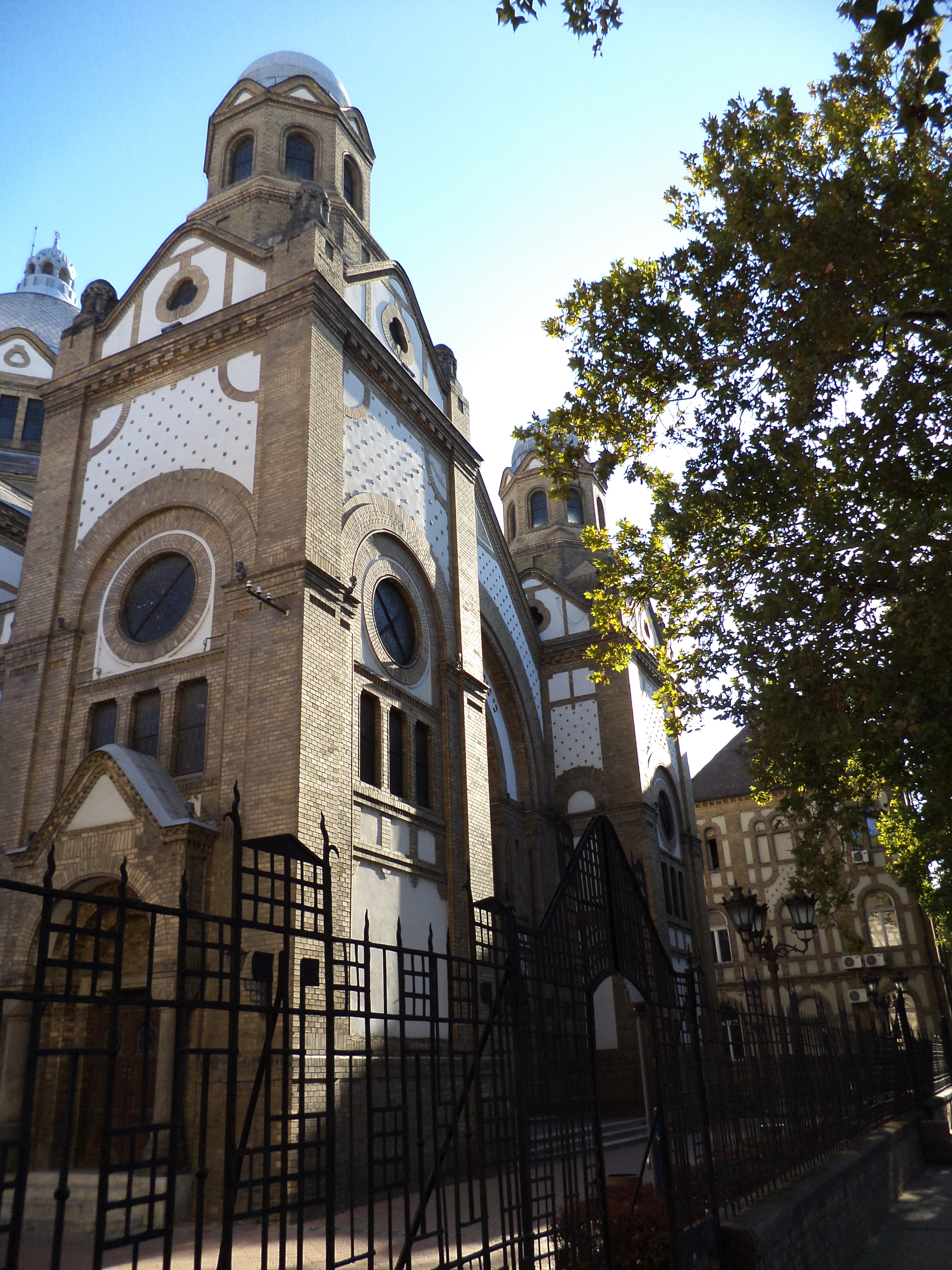
Entrance gateway

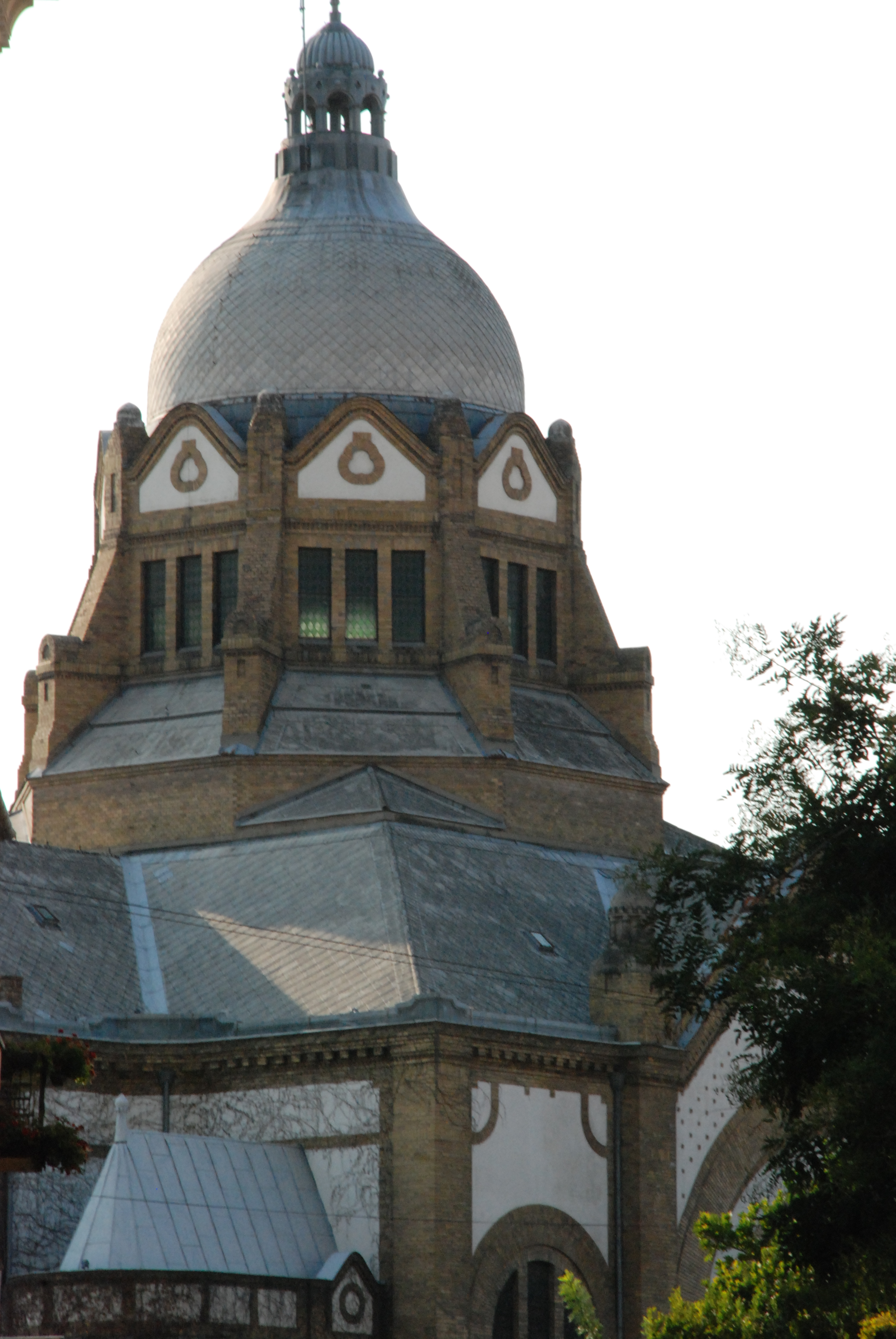
Dome
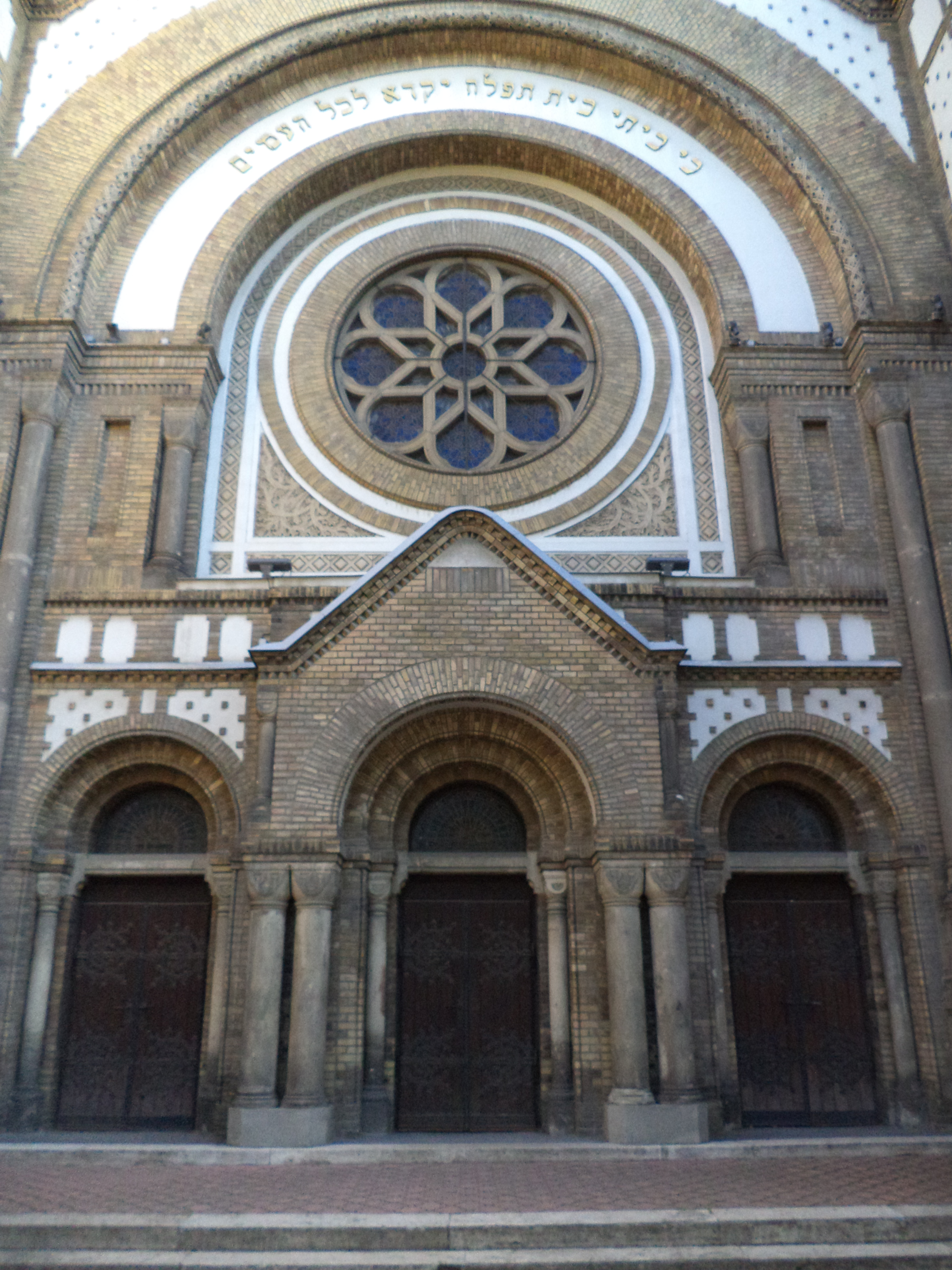
Central main entrance

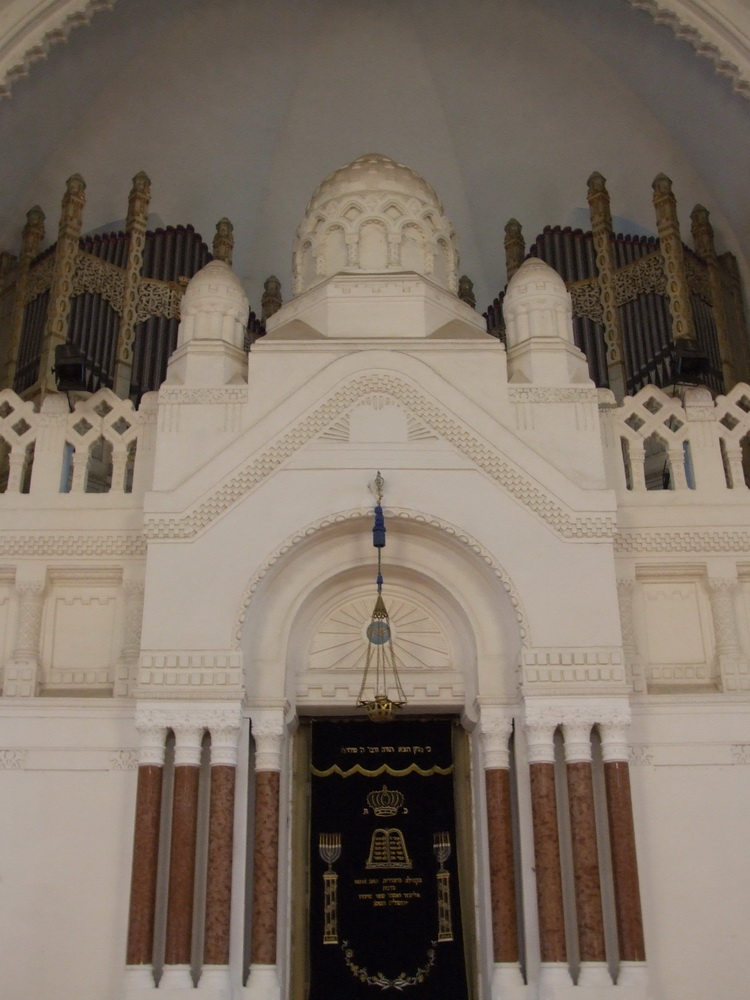
Torah ark

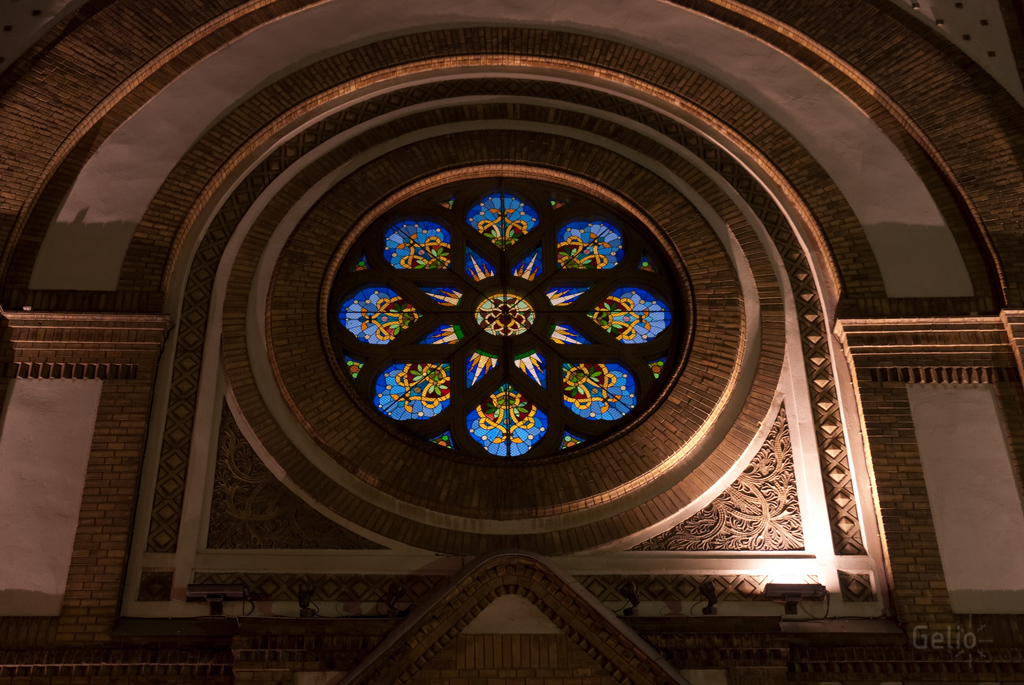
Central stained glass window

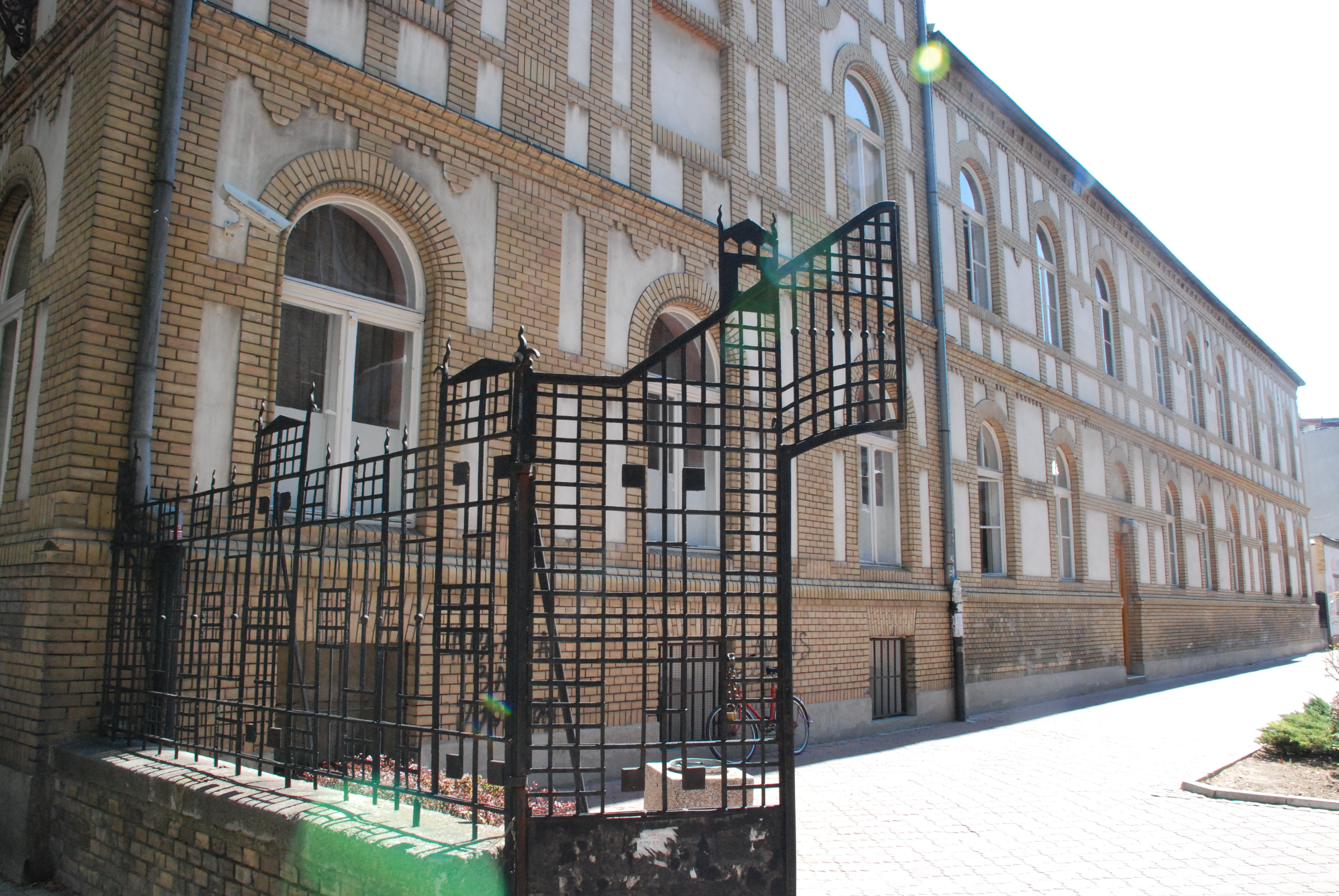
Jewish Community of Novi Sad building

== See also ==
- List of synagogues in Serbia
- Religious architecture in Novi Sad
- History of the Jews in Serbia
