= Religious architecture in Novi Sad =

Architecture in Serbia

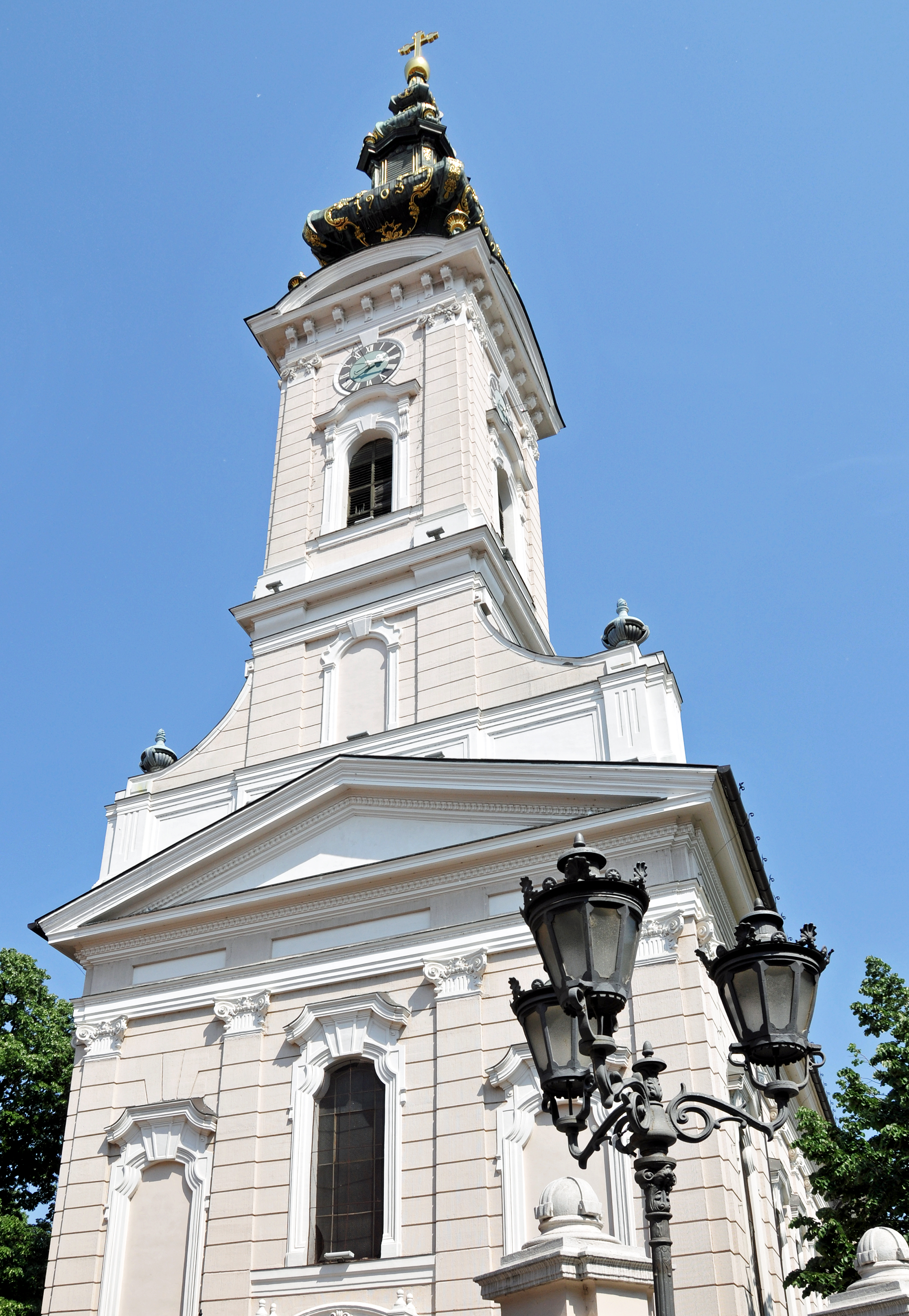
Saint George Cathedral

Religious architecture in Novi Sad is very diverse. Majority of the believers in Novi Sad are from Serbian Orthodox Church, while others are from Roman Catholic Church, many Protestant churches, and Jewish community. Stari Grad is the place with the majority of churches and temples, and they were all built in the 18th and 19th centuries.

The oldest religious building in the city was Orthodox church dedicated to Saint John. This church was built in 1700, but was burned in the 1848–49 revolution. It was rebuilt in 1853, but was razed in 1921.

== Orthodox churches ==
The main Orthodox church in the city is Saint George Cathedral (Saborna Crkva svetog Đorđa), built in 1742, it is next to the Bishop's Palace, the seat of the Serbian Orthodox Eparchy of Bačka. In city centre there are also the Church of the Dormition of the Theotokos (Uspenska crkva), built in 1736, Church of the Three Holy Hierarchs (Crkva Sveta Tri jerarha) in Almaški Kraj, built in 1797 and the Church of St. Nicholas (Nikolajevska crkva), built in 1730 and rebuilt in 1849. There is also Church of Presentation (Vavedenjska crkva) in Petrovaradin, as well as an Orthodox church in Sremska Kamenica, built in 1737–1758.

In the 1990s, at end of the state socialist period in Serbia, numerous new Serbian Orthodox churches were built in Novi Sad's neighbourhoods: in Klisa, Telep, Bistrica, Detelinara, Petrovaradin, Paragovo, and Veternik. These new churches are all built in Neo-Byzantine architecture and very different from the older Orthodox churches in the city, which are of a more Central Europe-type architecture.

Kovilj Monastery is the only Orthodox monastery in the municipal area of Novi Sad. It is located near the village of Kovilj. It was reconstructed in 1705–07 and according to the legend, the monastery was founded by the first Serb archbishop Saint Sava in the 13th century.

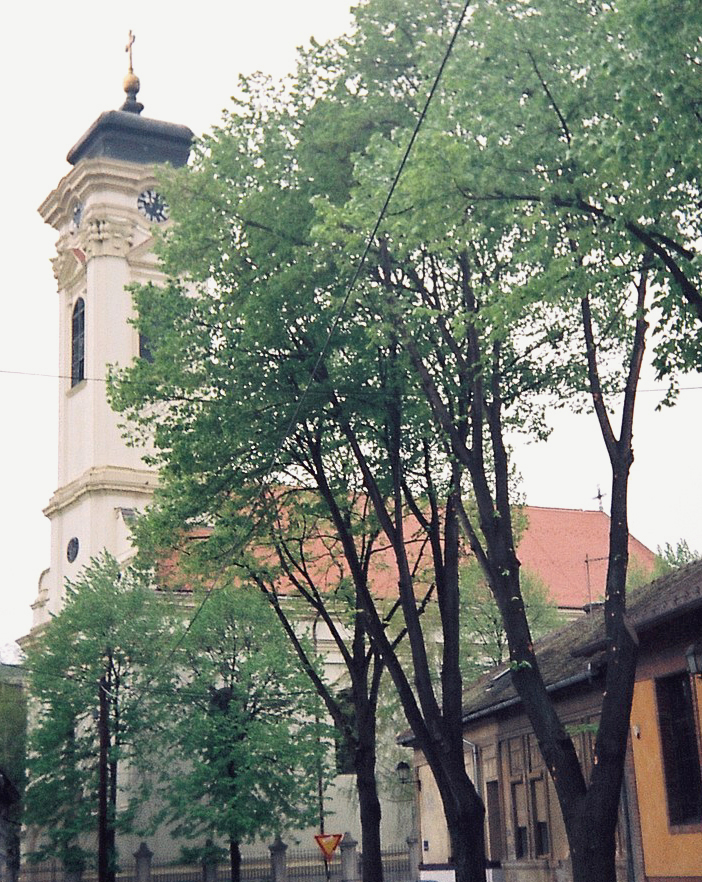
Orthodox Church of the Three Holy Hierarchs (Crkva Sveta Tri jerarha), also known as Almaš Church (Almaška crkva) in Almaški Kraj

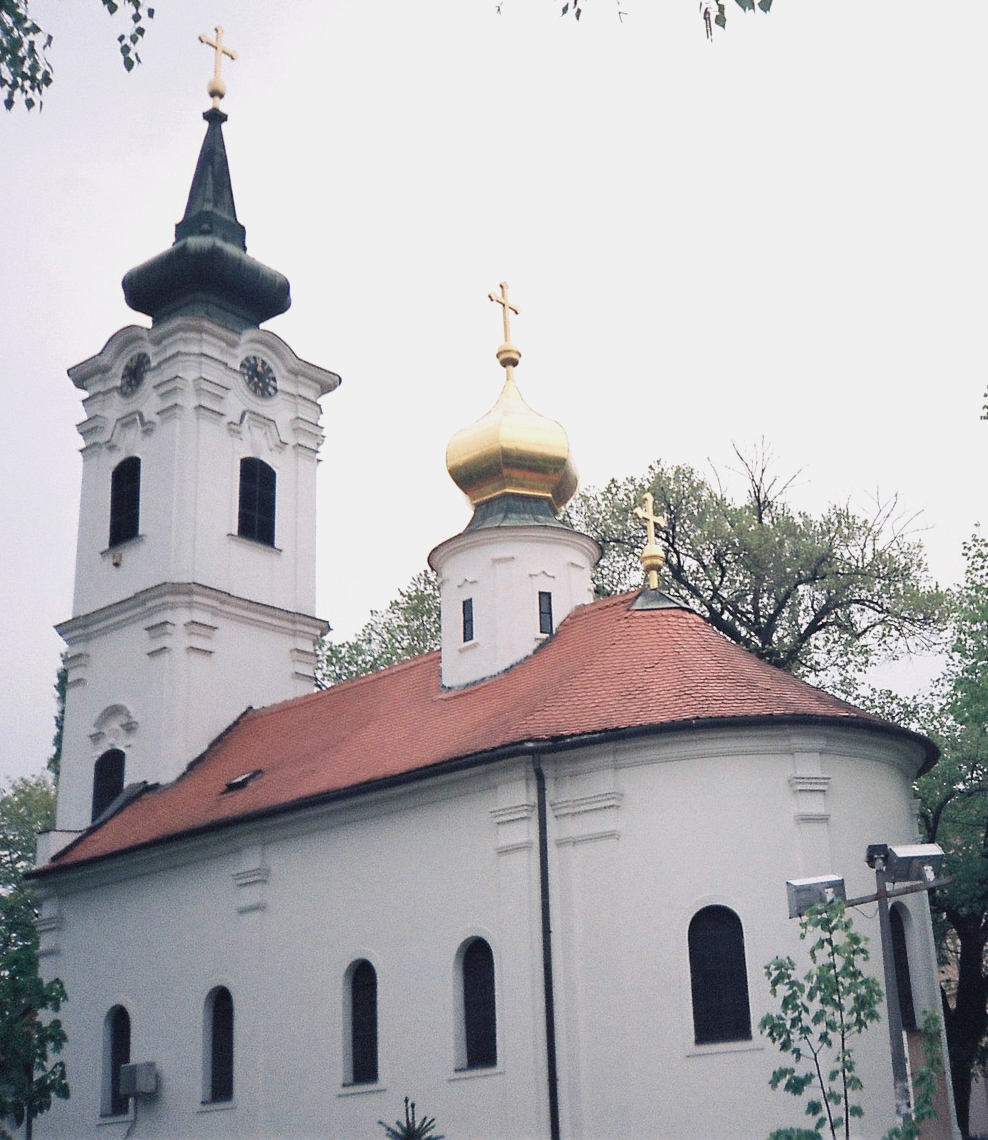
Orthodox Church of Translation of the relics St. Nicholas (Crkva prenosa moštiju Svetog Nikole), also known as Nikolajevska Church (Nikolajevska crkva) in Stari Grad

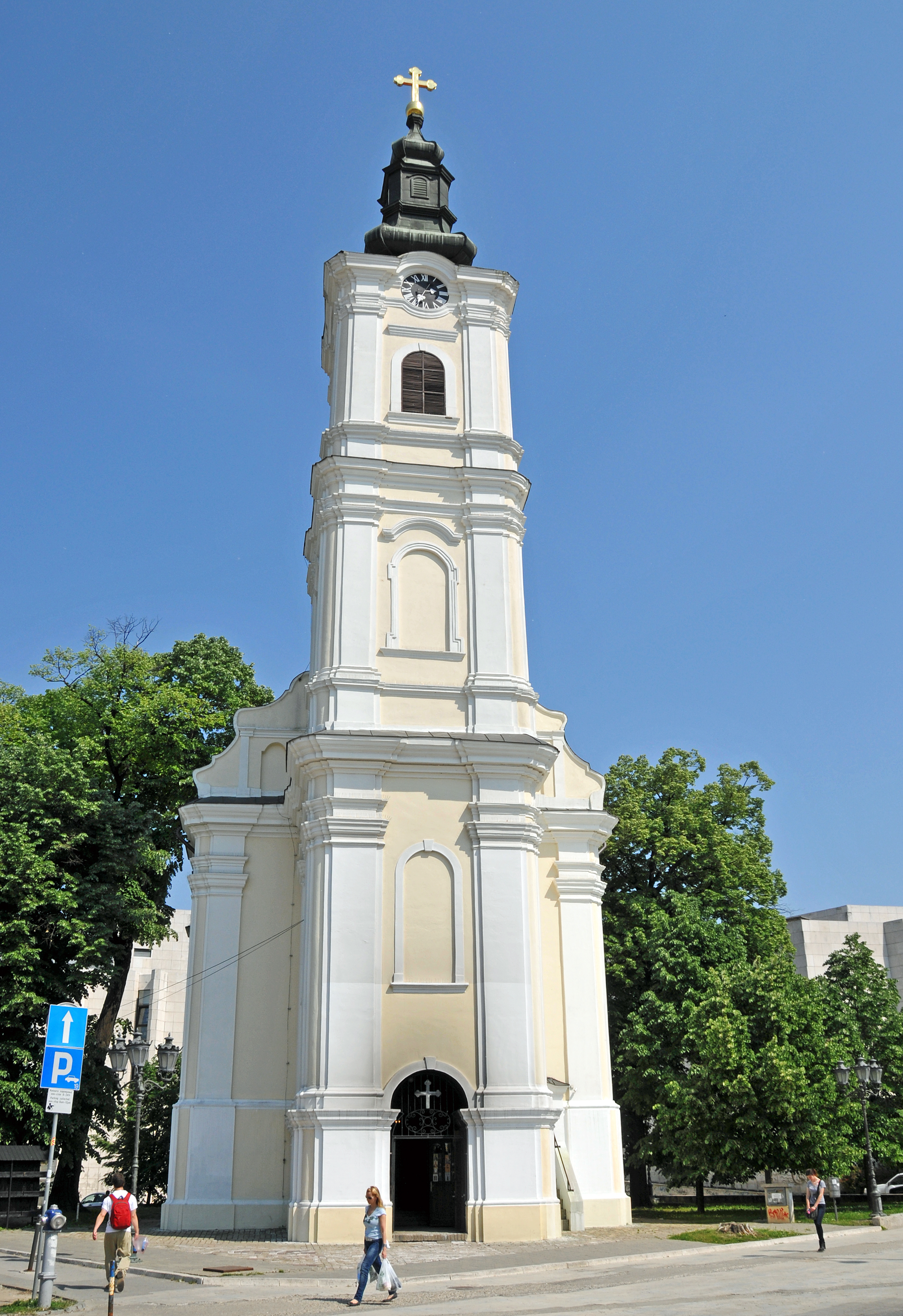
Orthodox Church of the Dormition of the Theotokos (Uspenska crkva) in Stari Grad

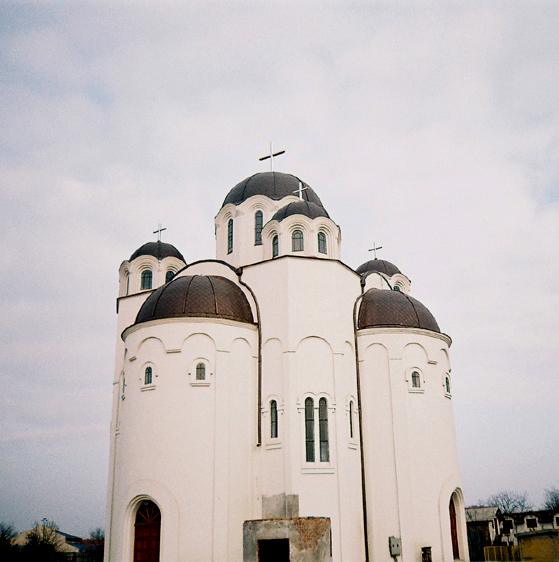
Orthodox Church of Saints Cyril and Methodius (Crkva Svetih Ćirila i Metodija) in Telep

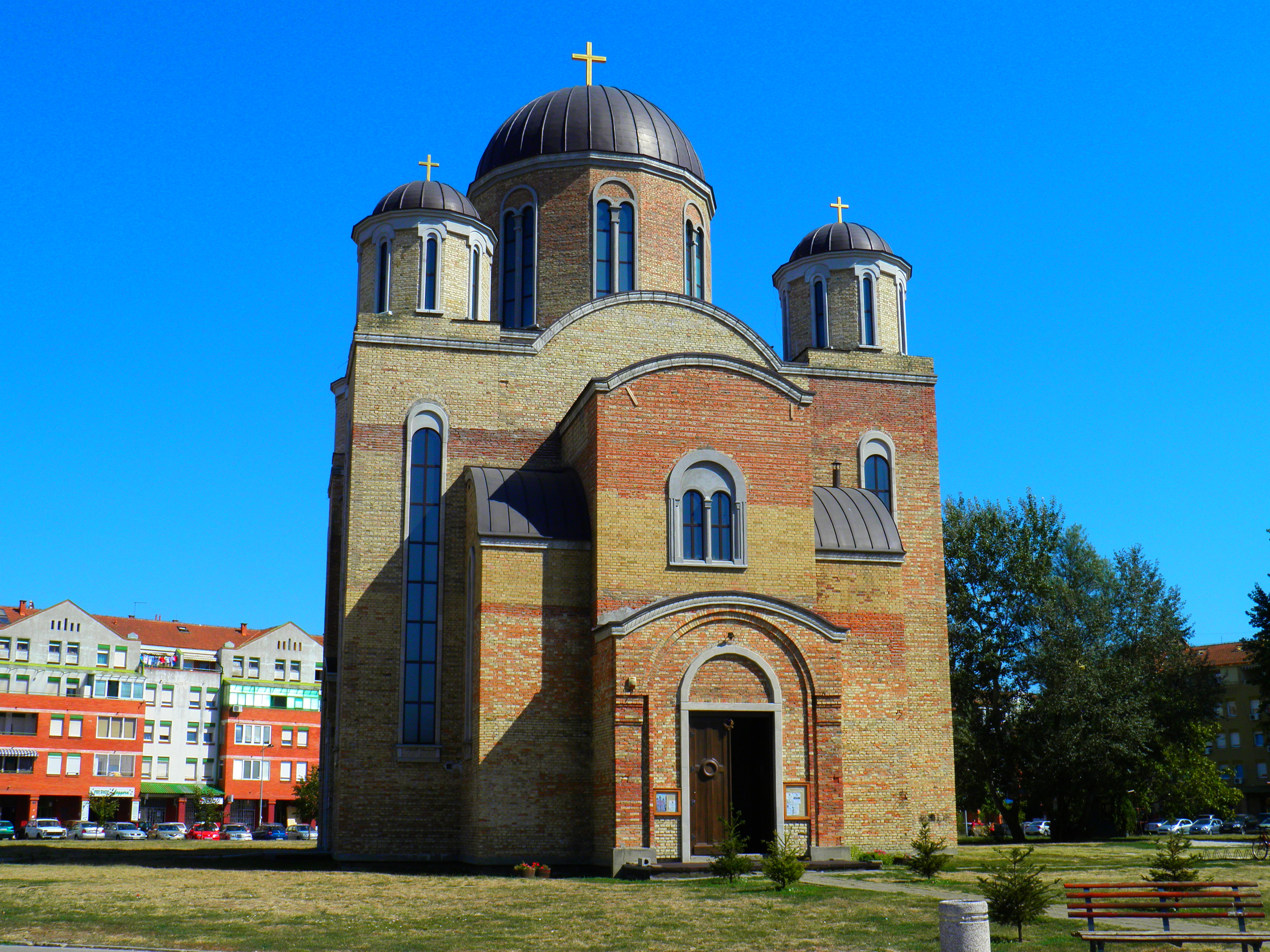
Orthodox Church of Translation of the relics of St. Sava (Hram Prenosa moštiju Svetog Save) in Bistrica

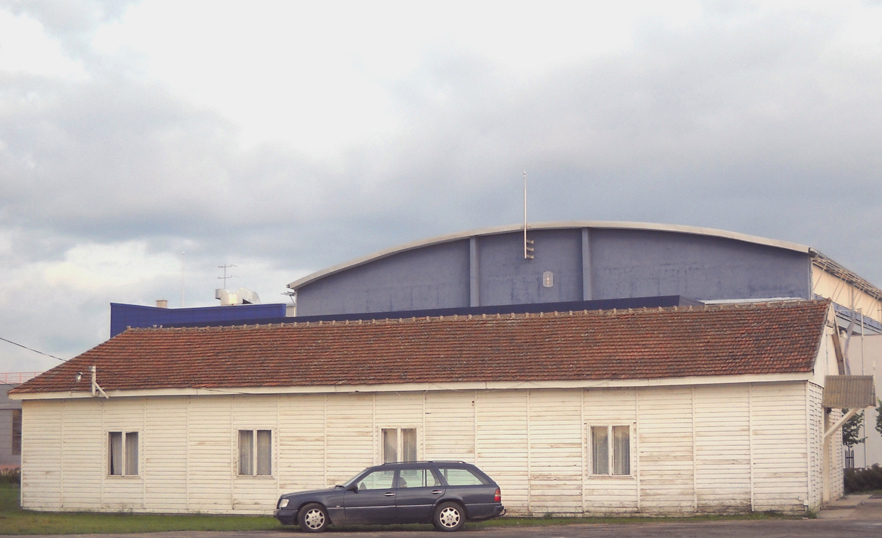
Wooden Orthodox Church in Slana Bara

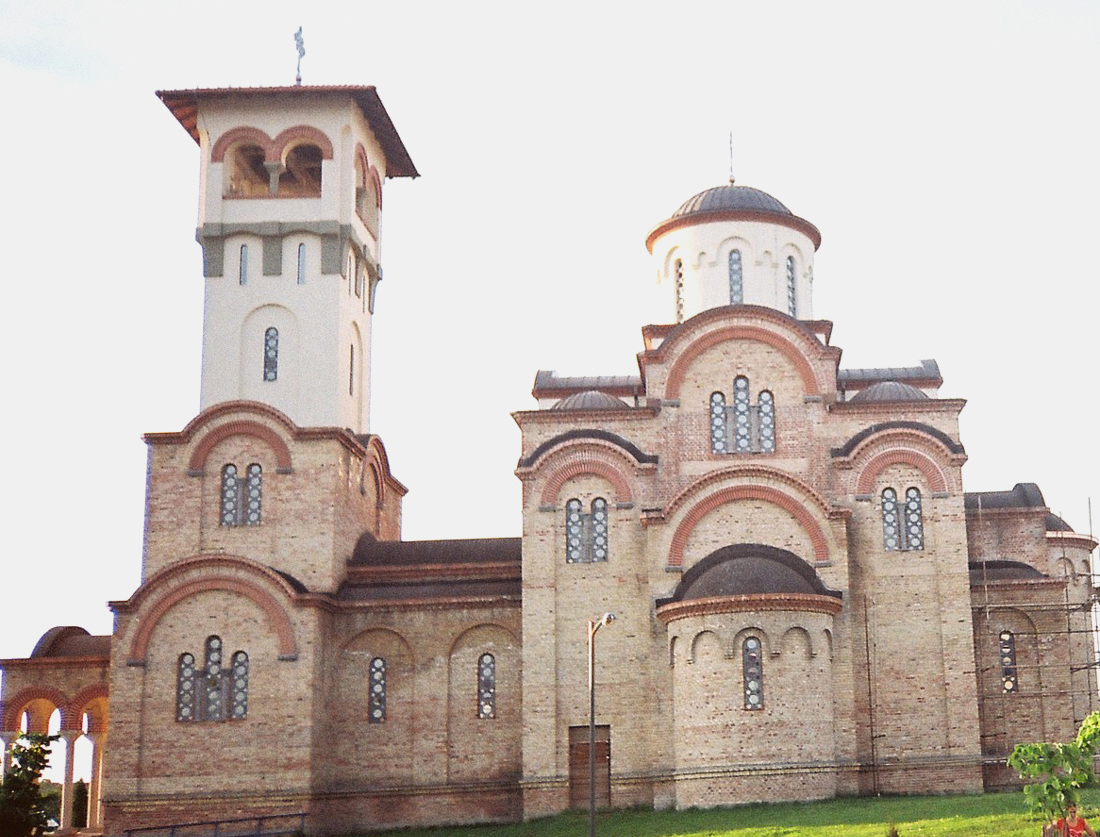
Orthodox Church of the Ascension of Lord (Hram Vaznesenja Gospodnjeg) in Slana Bara

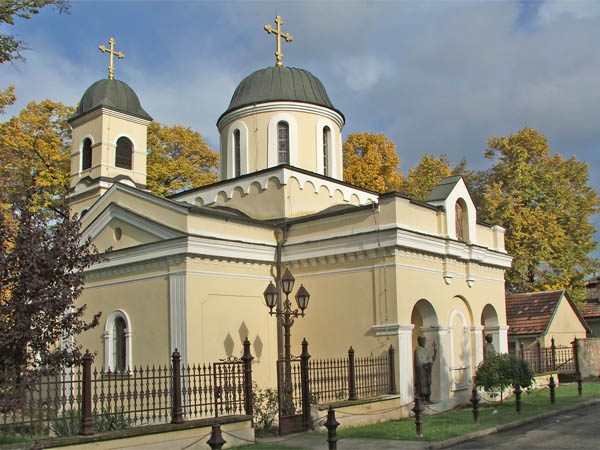
Orthodox Church of Holy Apostles Peter and Paul (Kapela Svetih apostola Petra i Pavla) in Petrovaradin

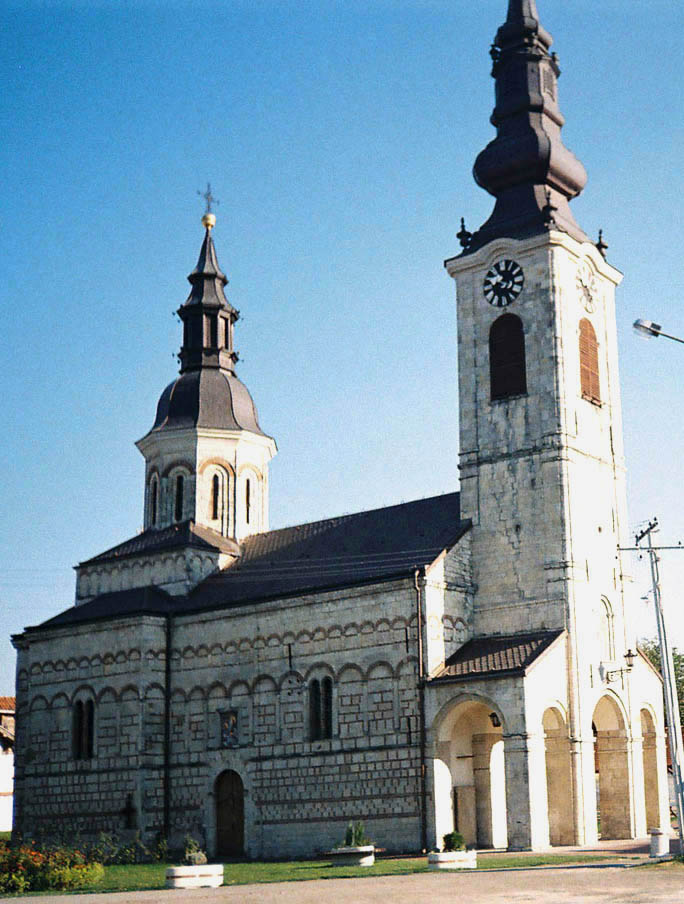
Church of the Nativity of the Theotokos (Hram Rođenja Bogorodice) in Sremska Kamenica

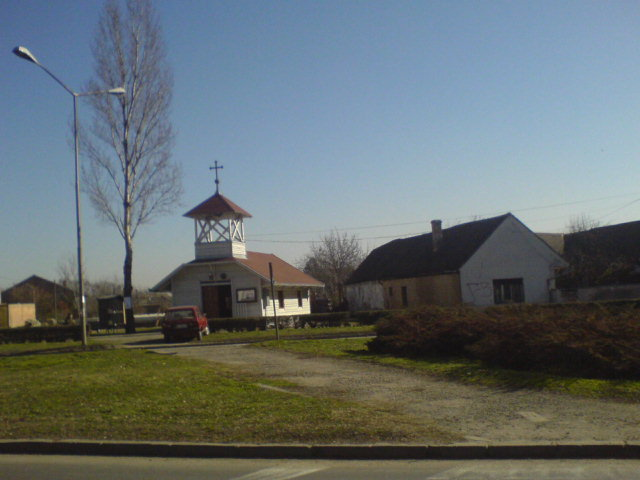
Church of Saint Petka (Crkva Svete Petke) in Petrovaradin

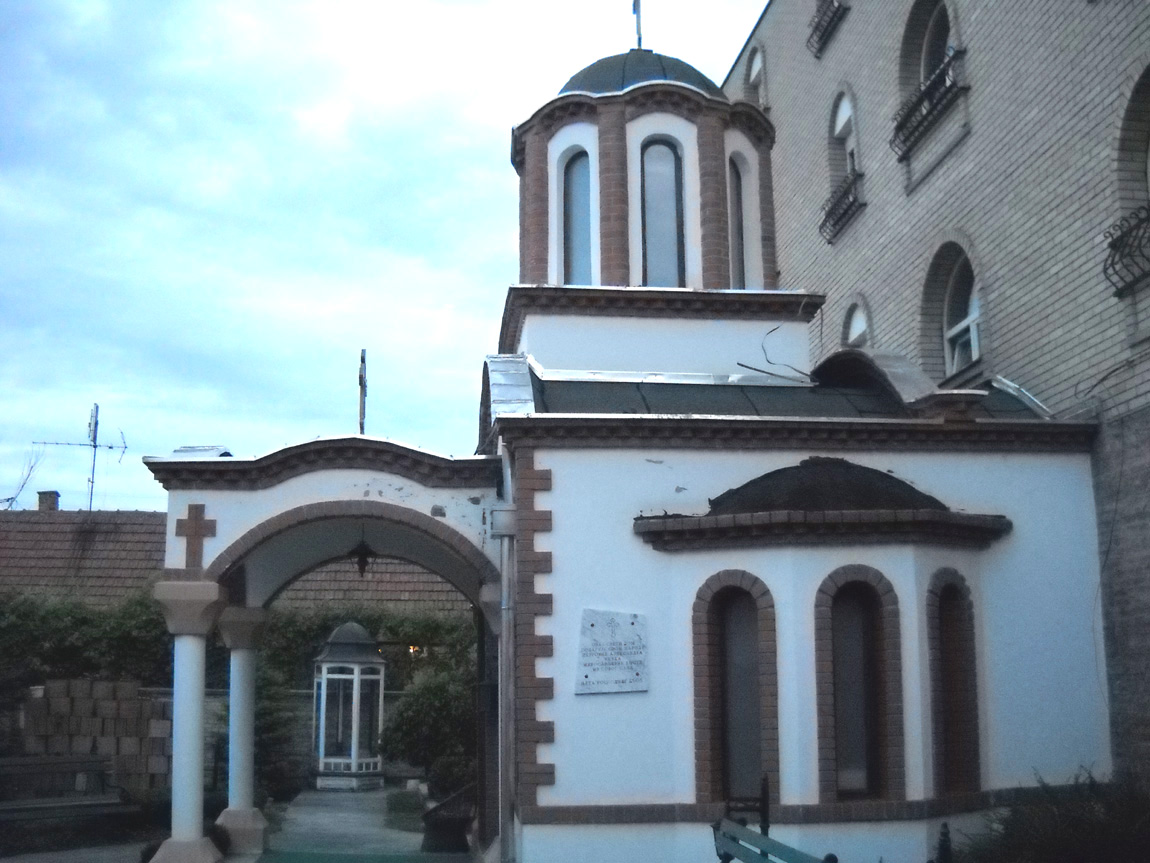
Church of Saint George (Crkva Svetog Georgija) in Petrovaradin

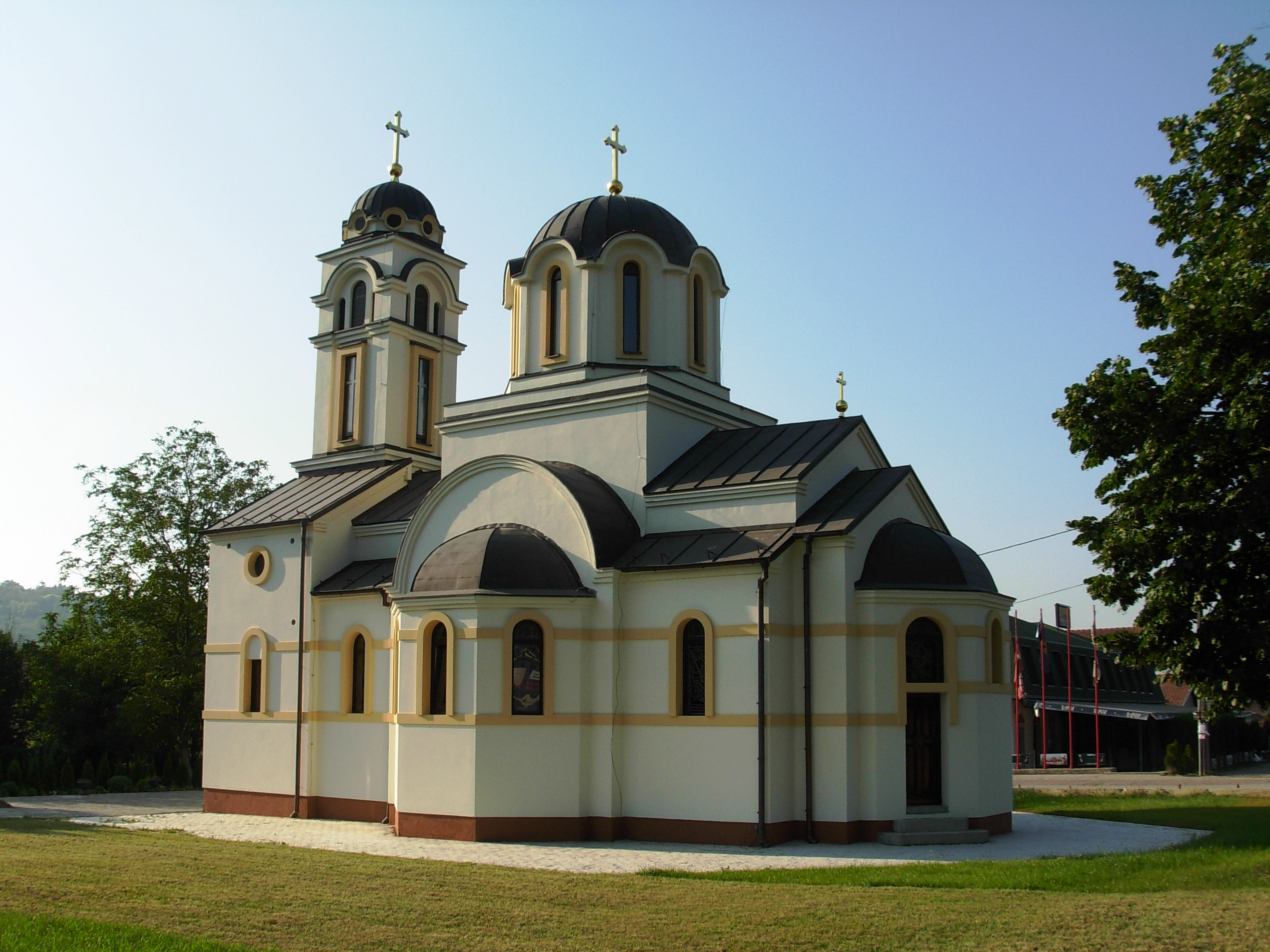
Church of the Holy Great Martyr Marina (Crkva Svete velikomučenice Marine) in Pragovo

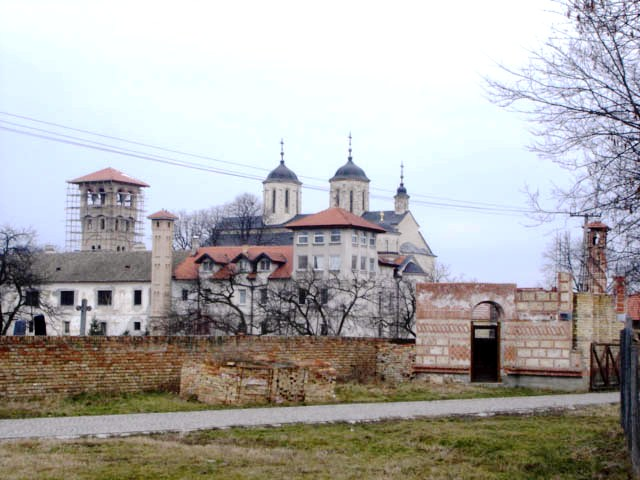
Kovilj monastery

== Roman Catholic churches ==
Although Roman Catholic churches and worshippers are a minority in the city, for historical reasons, The Name of Mary Church (Crkva imena Marijinog) dominates city centre and it is one of the most recognised structures in Novi Sad. Built in Gothic Revival architecture, in 1895 on the site of an older church, which was burnt down, it is the tallest temple in the Bačka region. There are also two more Roman Catholic churches in the city, one in Telep and one in Grbavica (in Futoška street). There are also three Catholic churches in Petrovaradin and one in Sremska Kamenica (built in 1746), as well as a Franciscan monastery in Petrovaradin (1701–1714). Tekije Church in Petrovaradin, built in 1881, is used by all 3 Christian communities in the city: Orthodox, Protestant, and Catholic. There was also one Armenian church dedicated to St. Gregory the Illuminator, which was built in 1746, destroyed during bombardment in 1849, and then rebuild in 1872 with funds of Serbian philanthrope Marija Trandafil. This church was finally demolished in 1963 to make way for new boulevard.

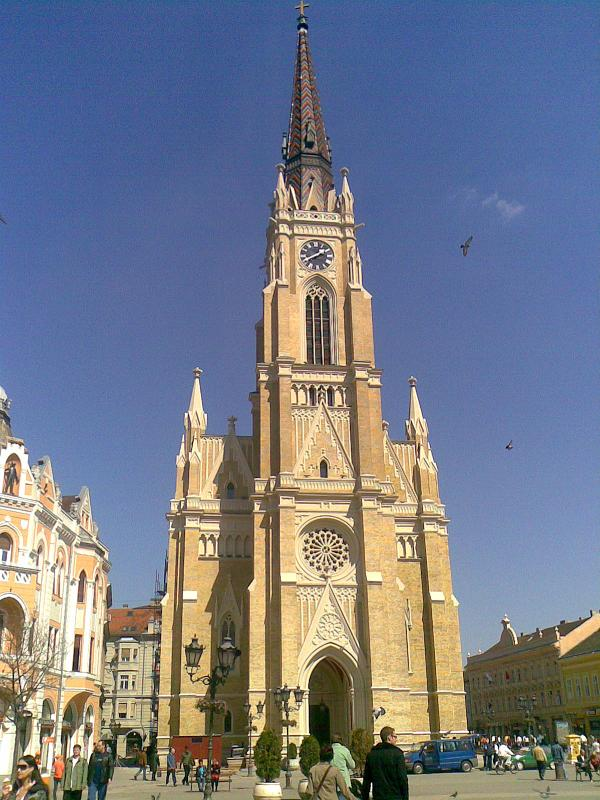
Name of Mary Church

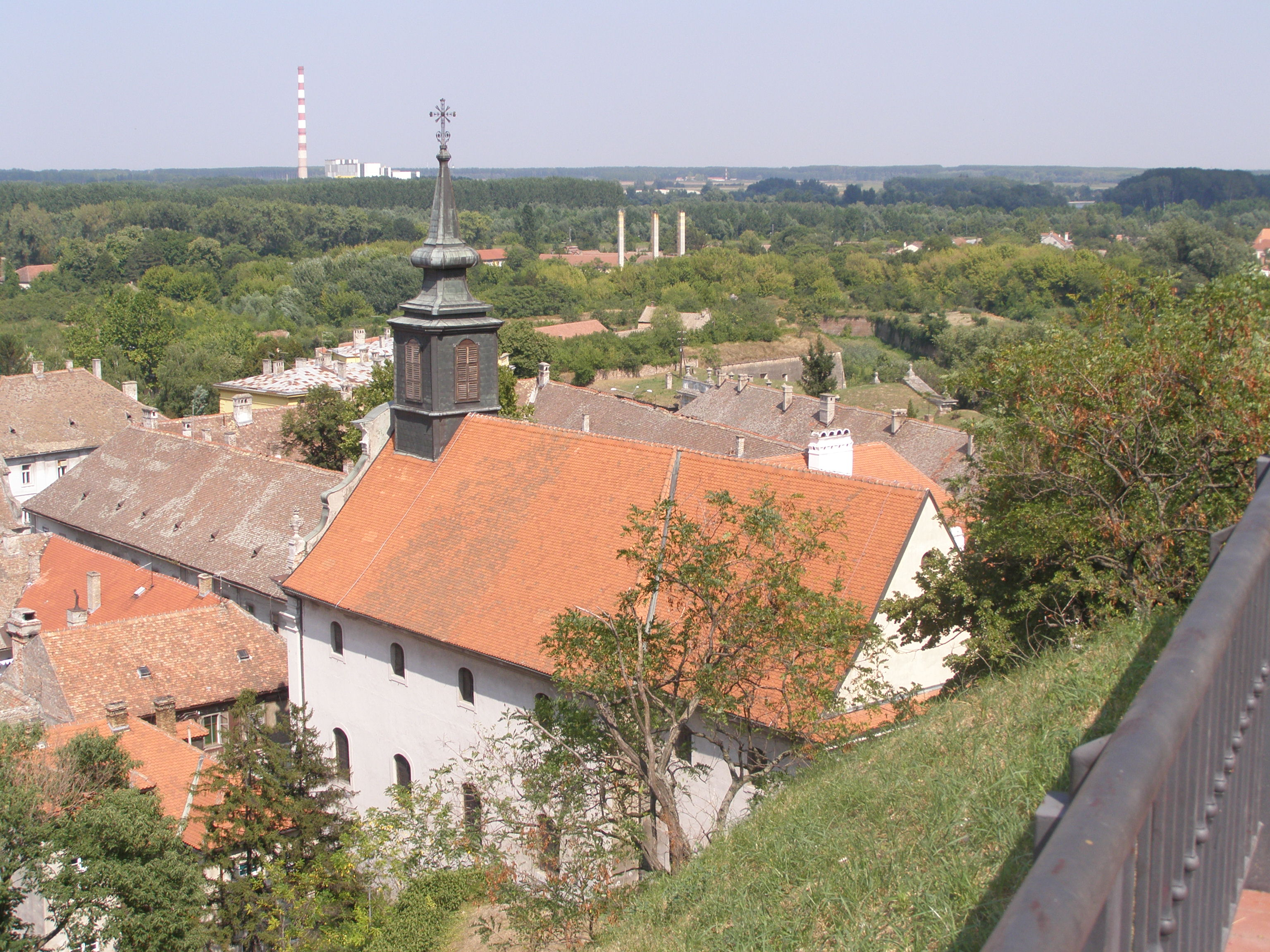
Saint George Church in Petrovaradin

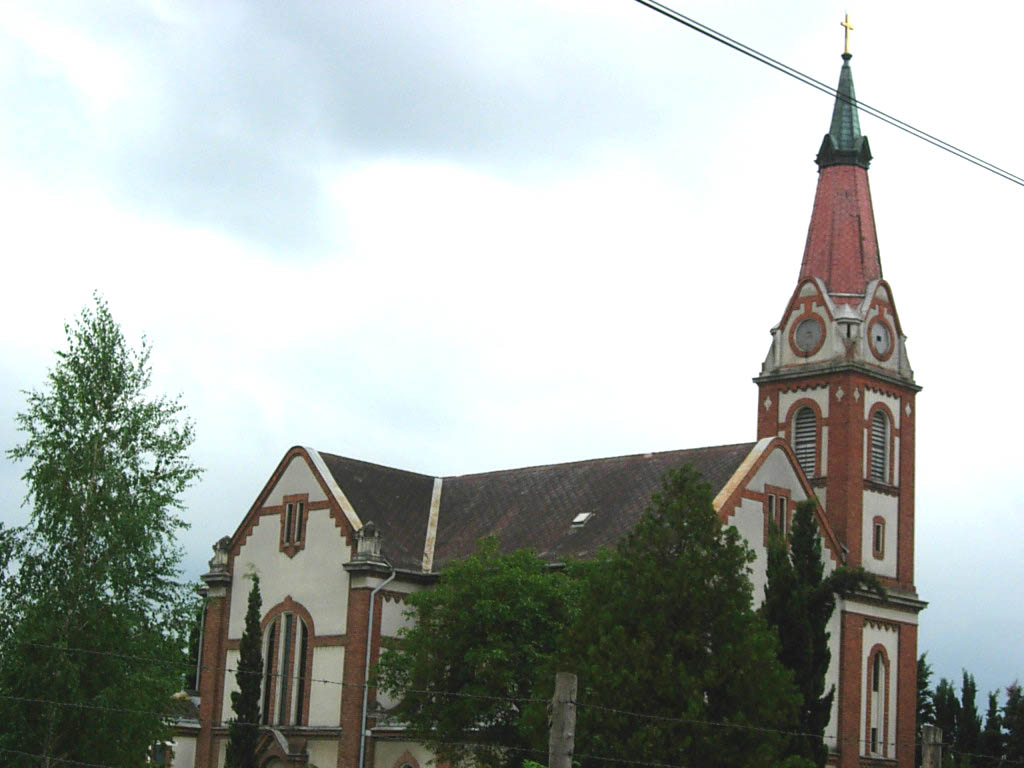
Saint Elizabeth Church in Telep

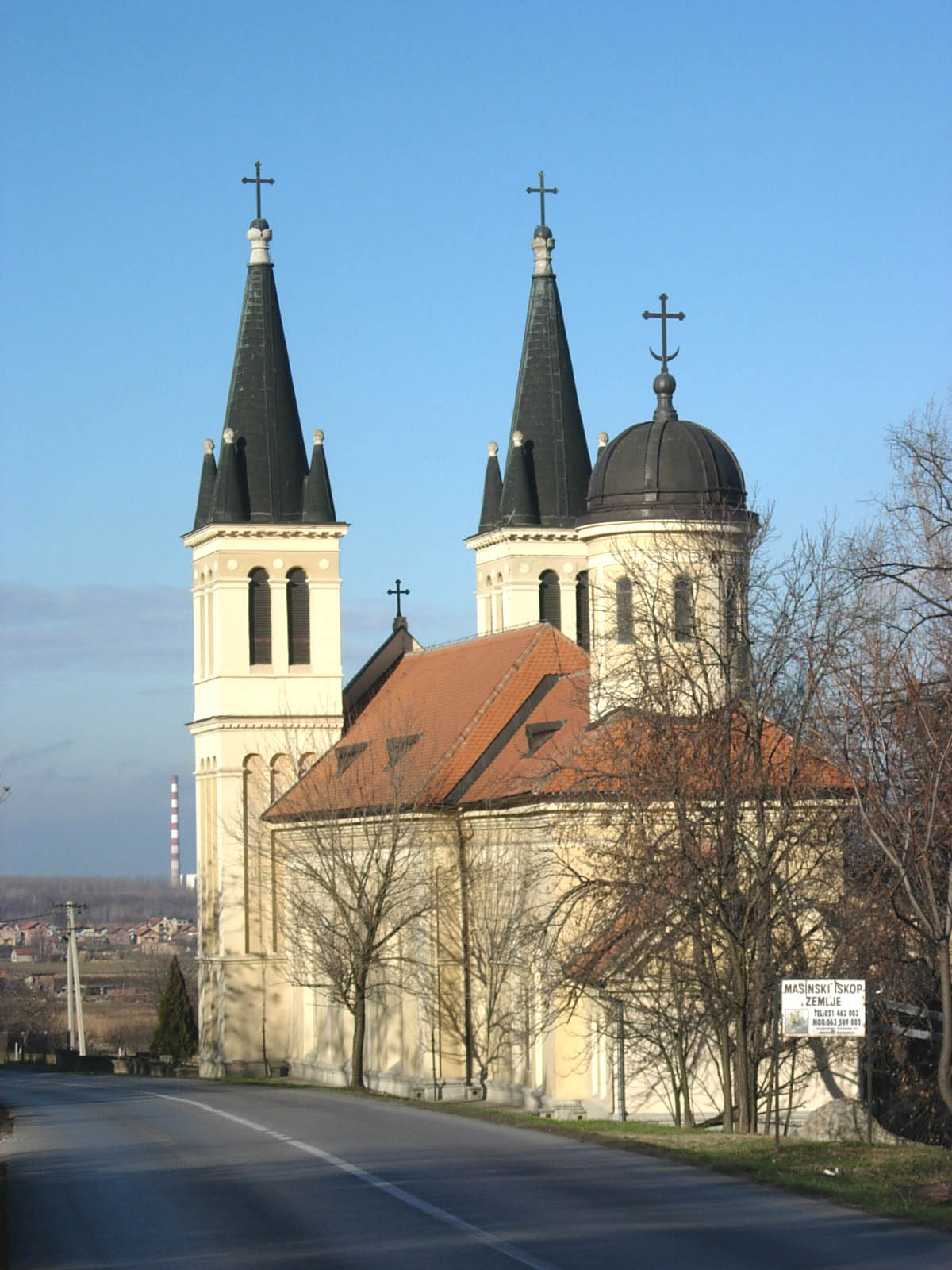
Our Lady of Snow Church in Petrovaradin

== Protestant churches ==
Rotkvarija neighborhood is home to the Slovak Lutheran church, built in 1886, conducting services predominantly in Slovak (occasionally in Serbian and German) and two Reformist churches, on in city Center, built in 1865, and another one in Telep, both having services in Hungarian. There are also many smaller temples of Baptist, Methodist, Adventist, Pentecostal and other Protestant communities. In most Protestant churches in Novi Sad, services are in Serbian.

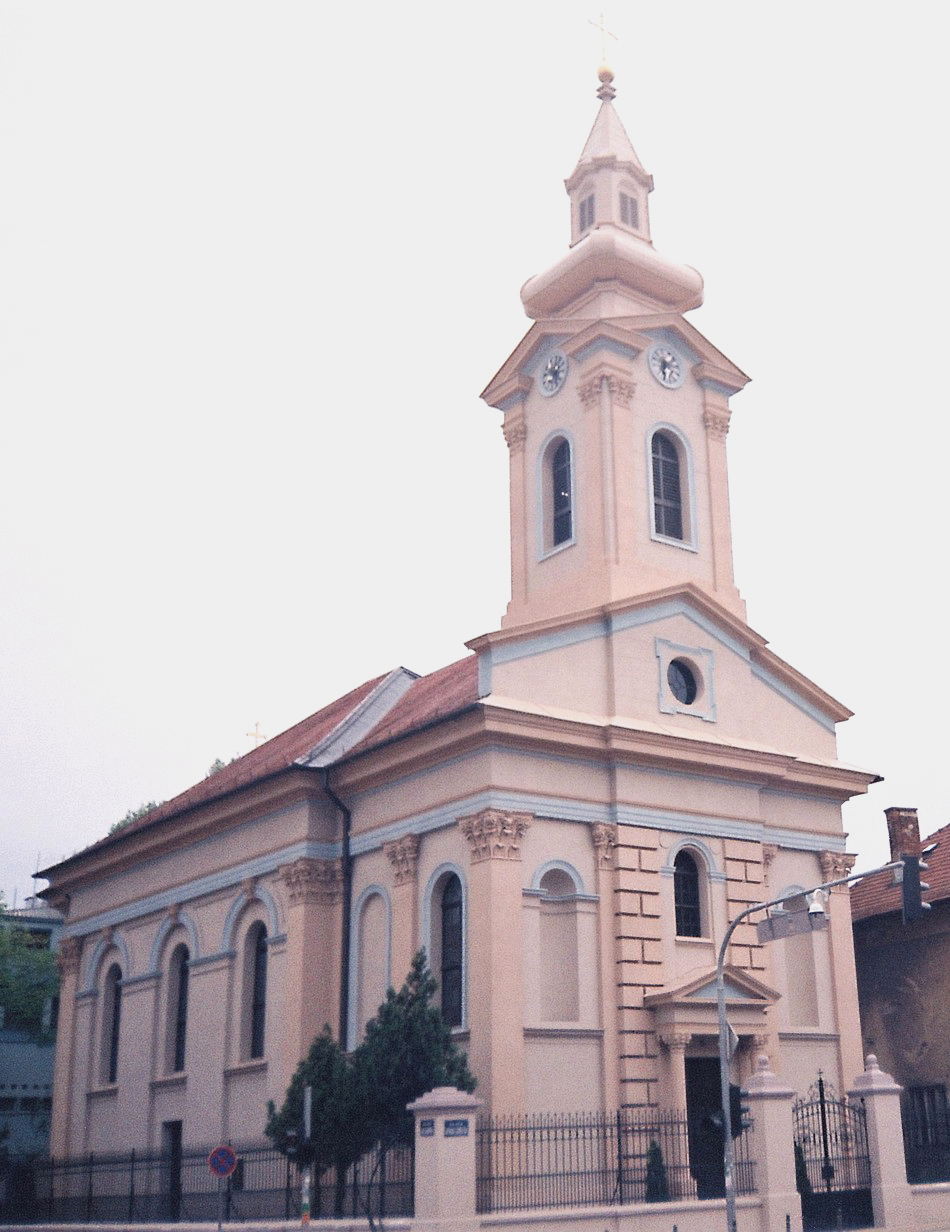
Slovak Evangelical A.V. (Lutheran) Church in Novi Sad

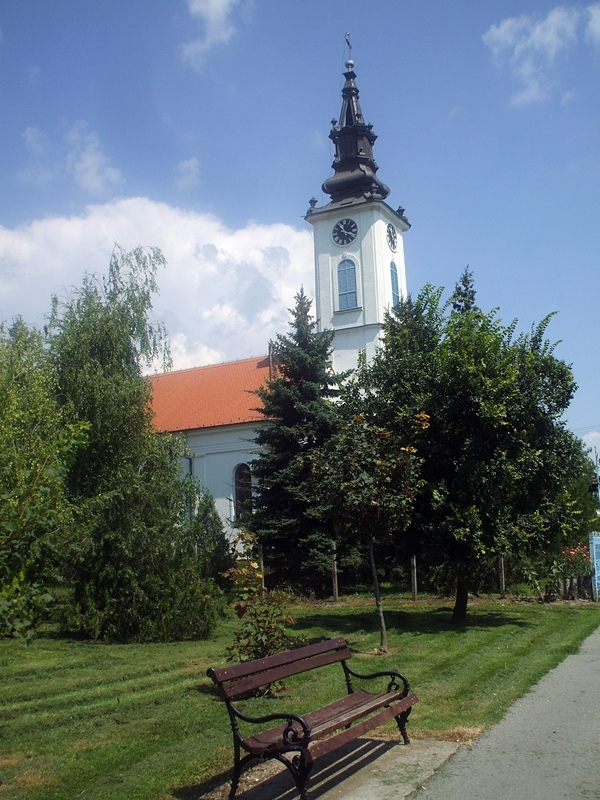
Slovak Evangelical A.V. (Lutheran) in Kisač

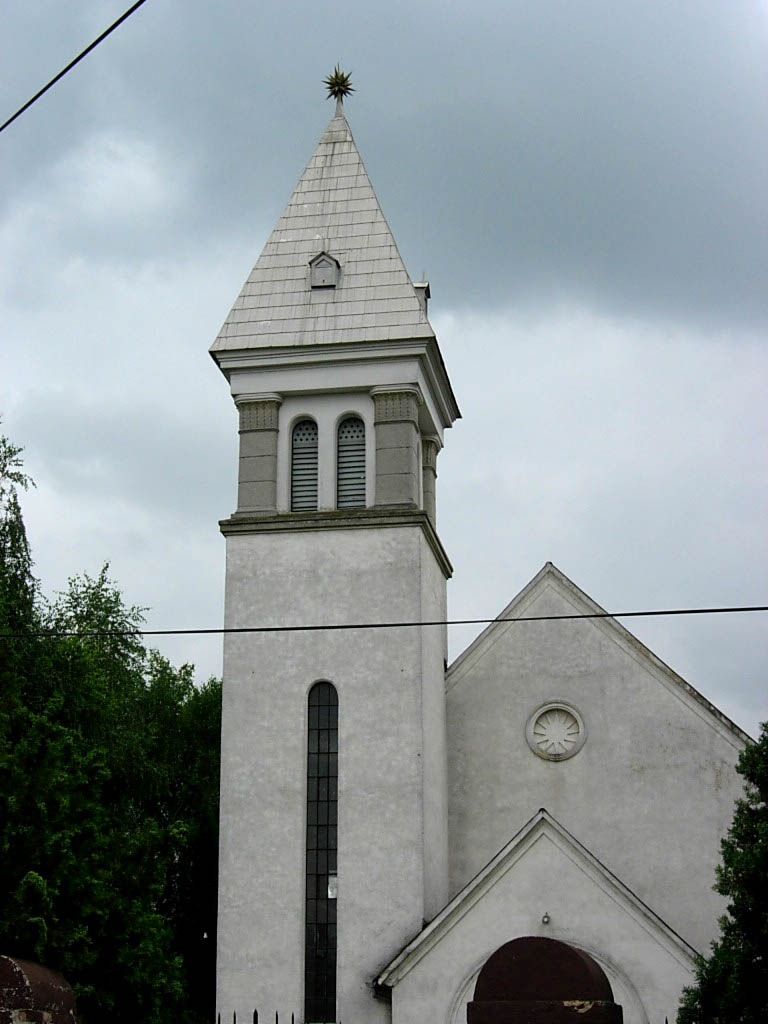
The Calvinist (Hungarian) church in Telep

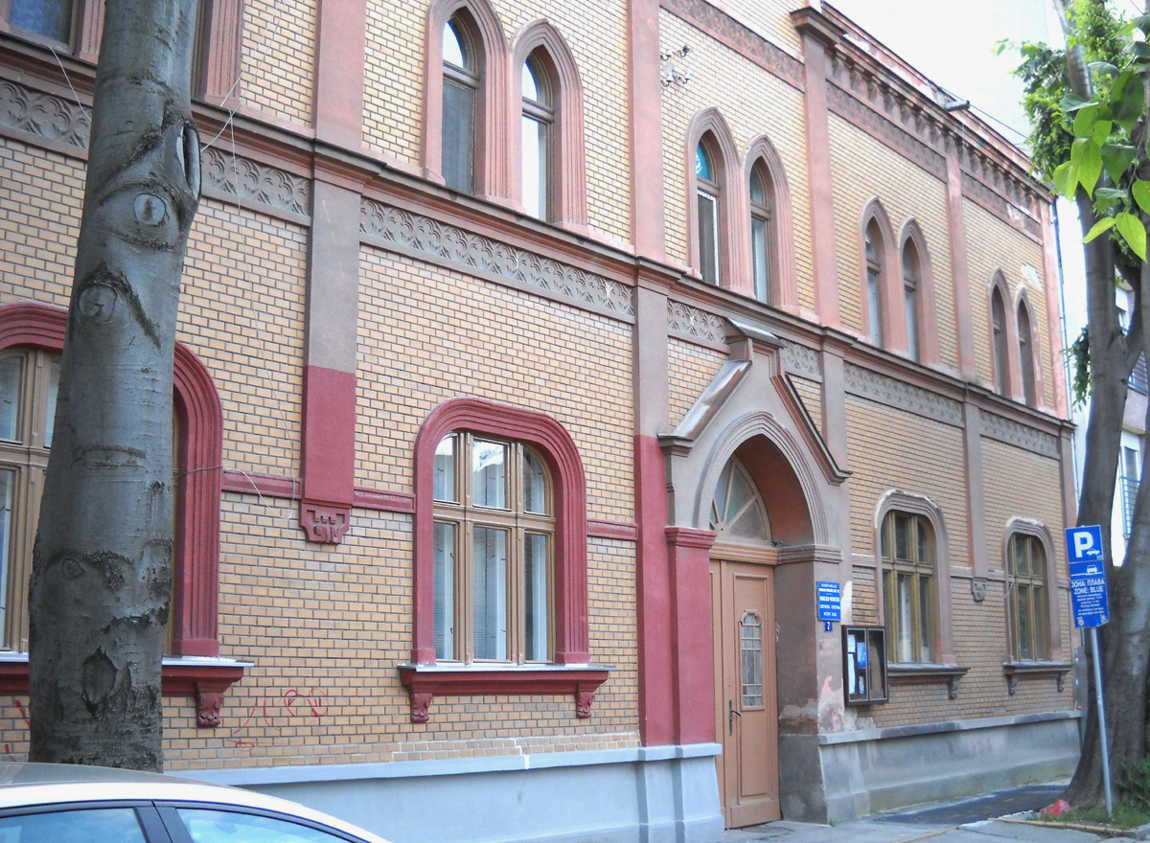
Evangelical Methodist Church

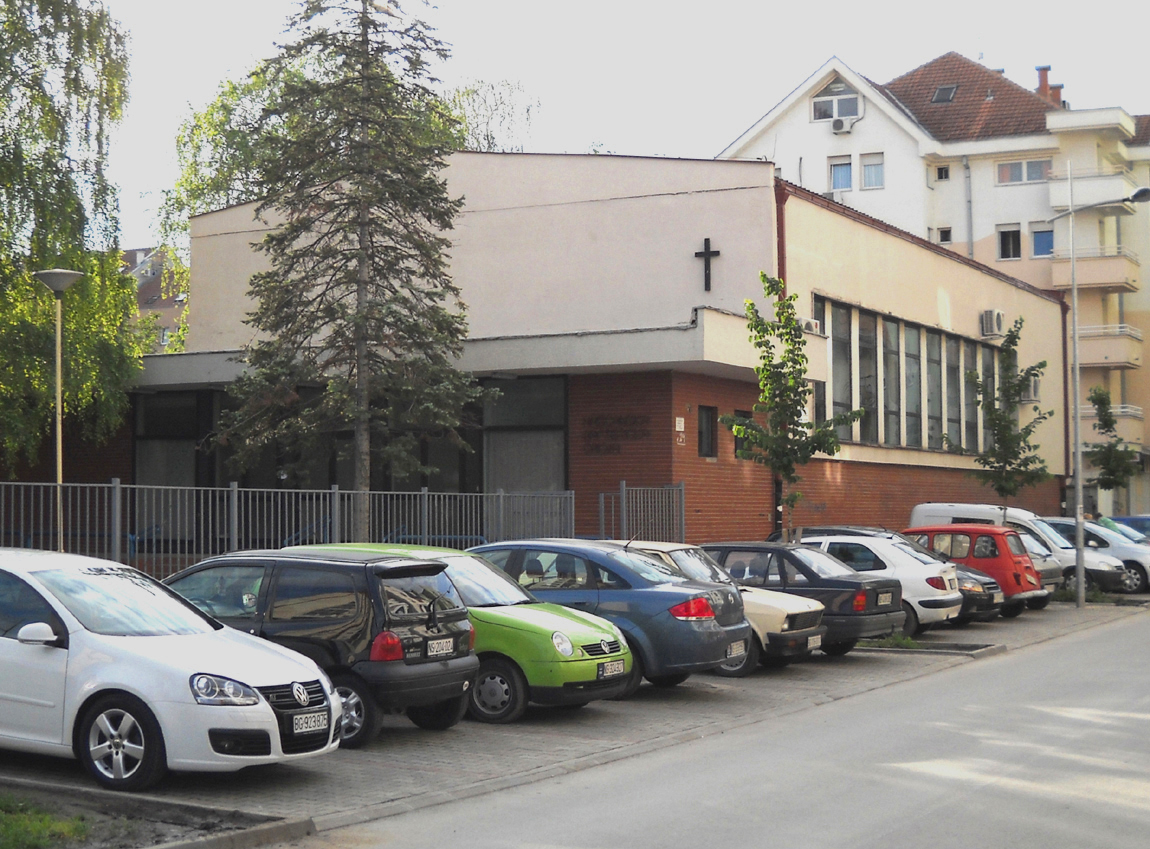
Christian Baptist Church

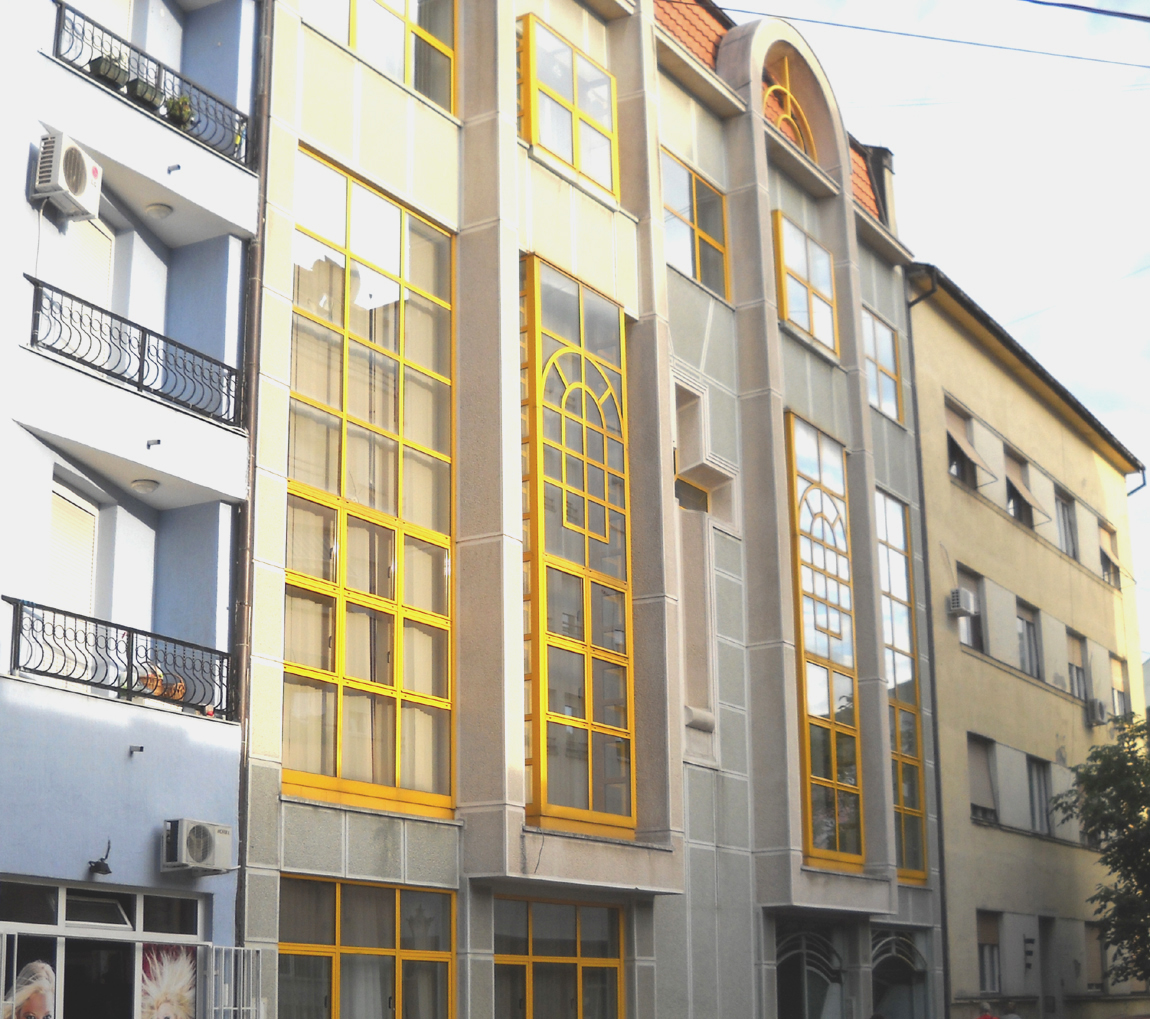
Christian Adventist Church

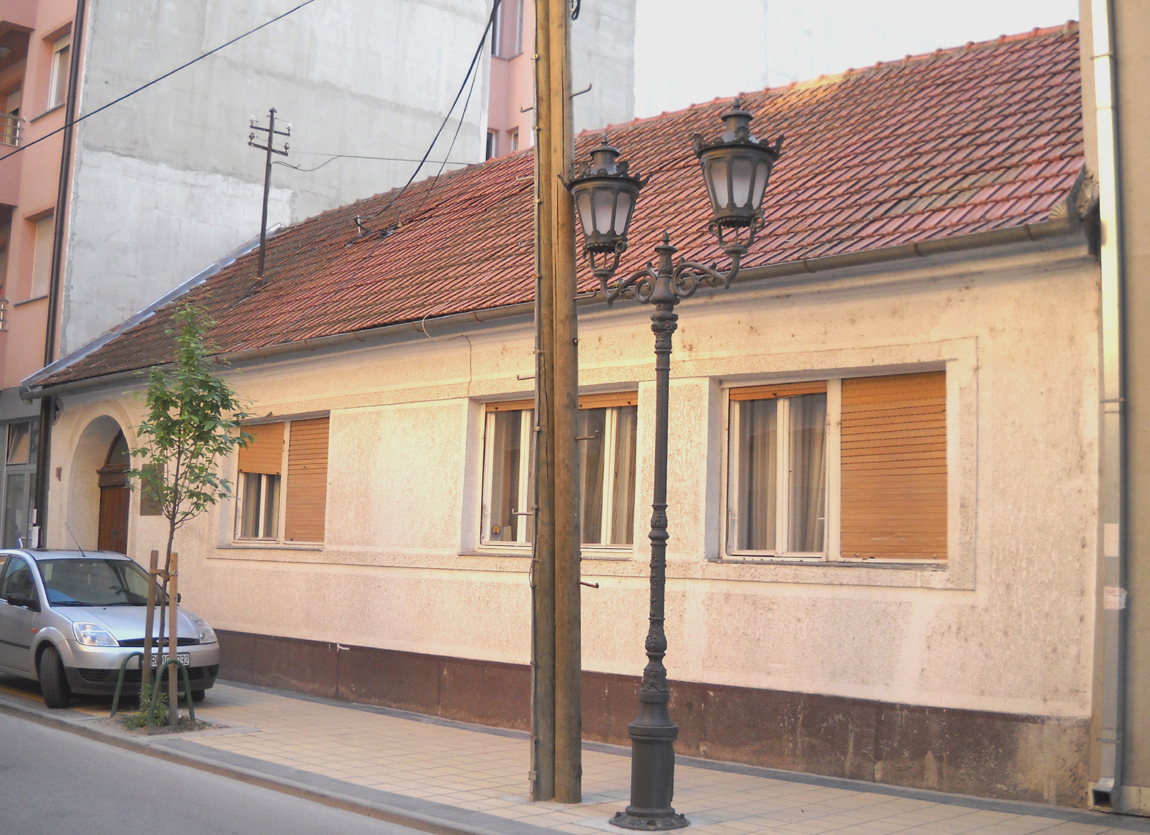
Adventist prayer house

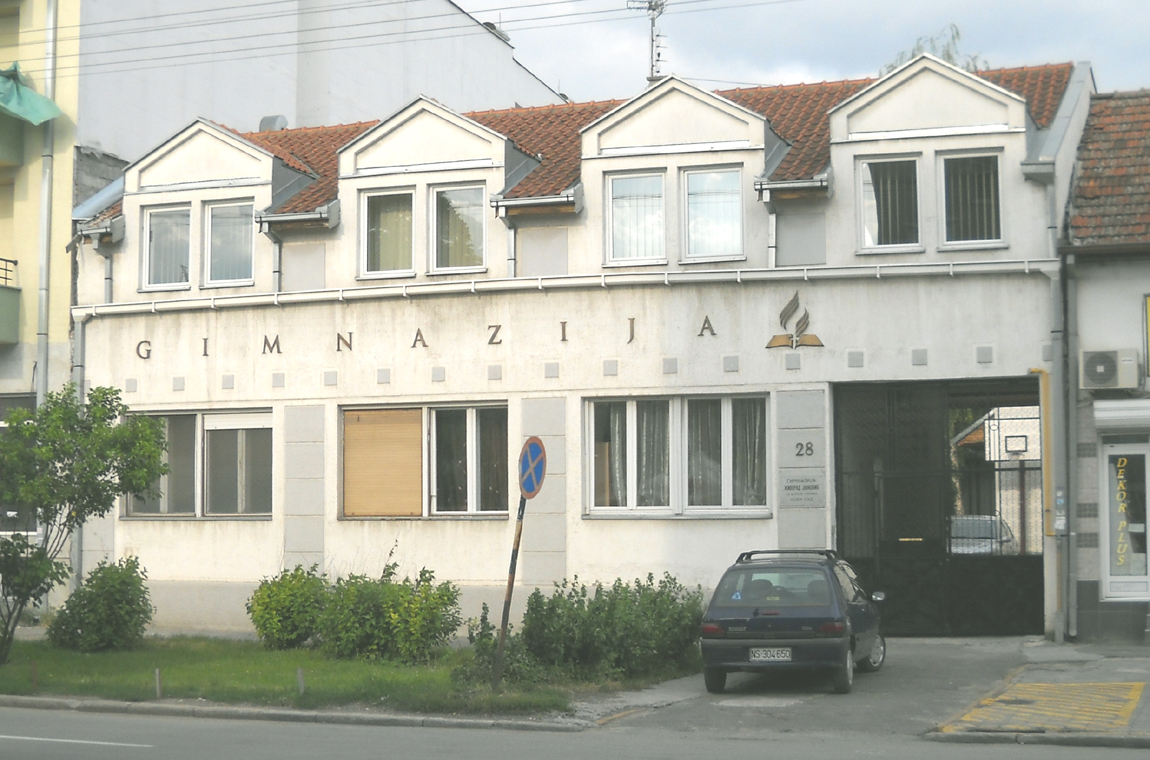
Adventist gymnasium "Živorad Janković"

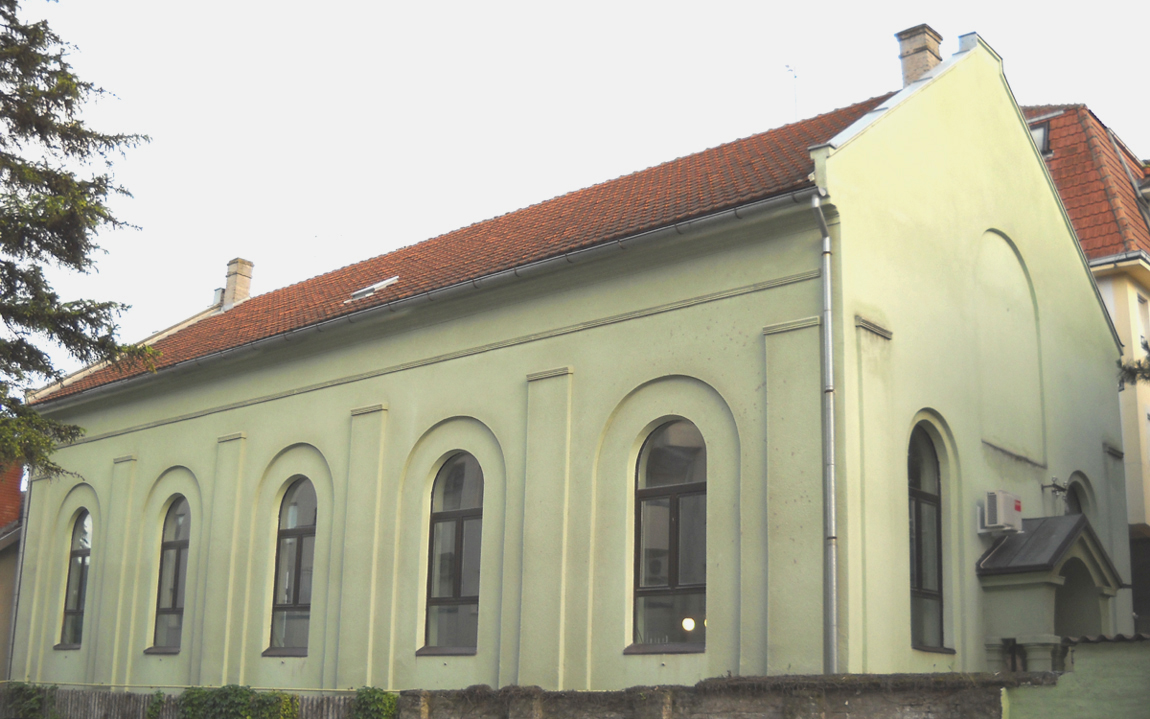
Prayer House of Nazarene Christian Community

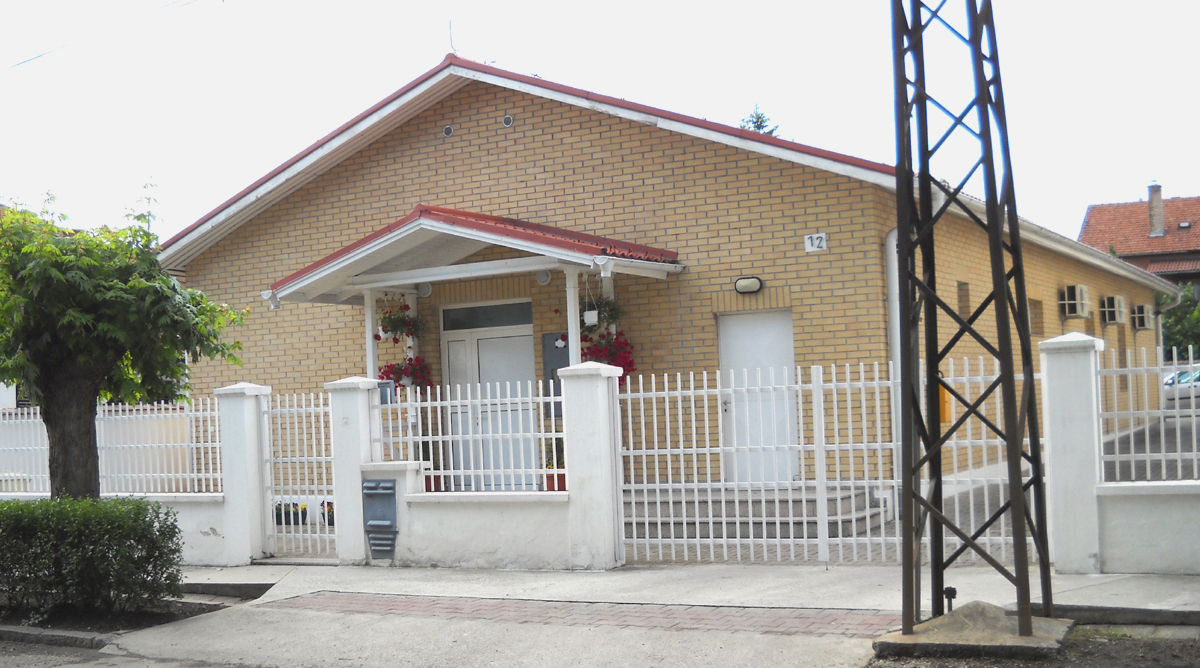
Jehovah's Witnesses prayer hall

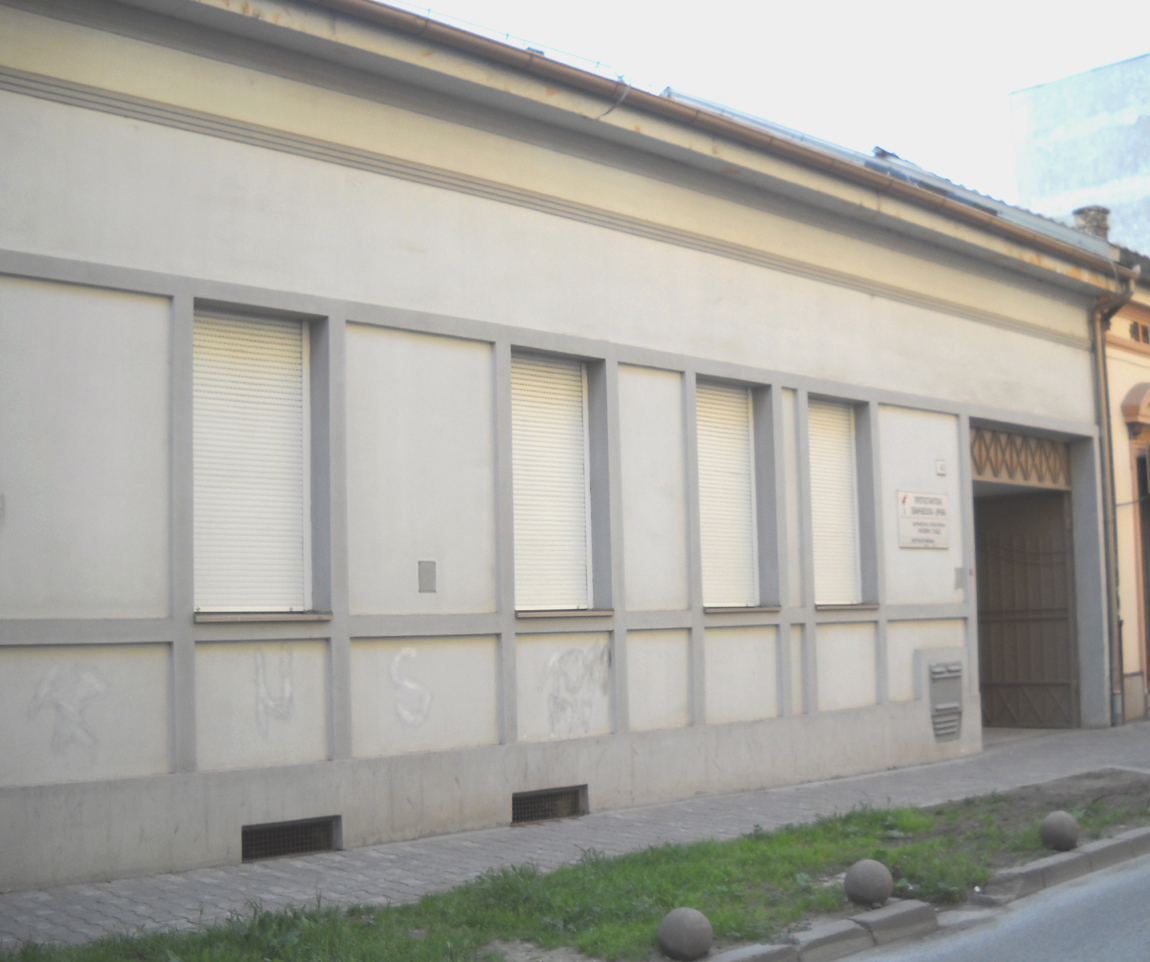
Protestant Evangelic Church

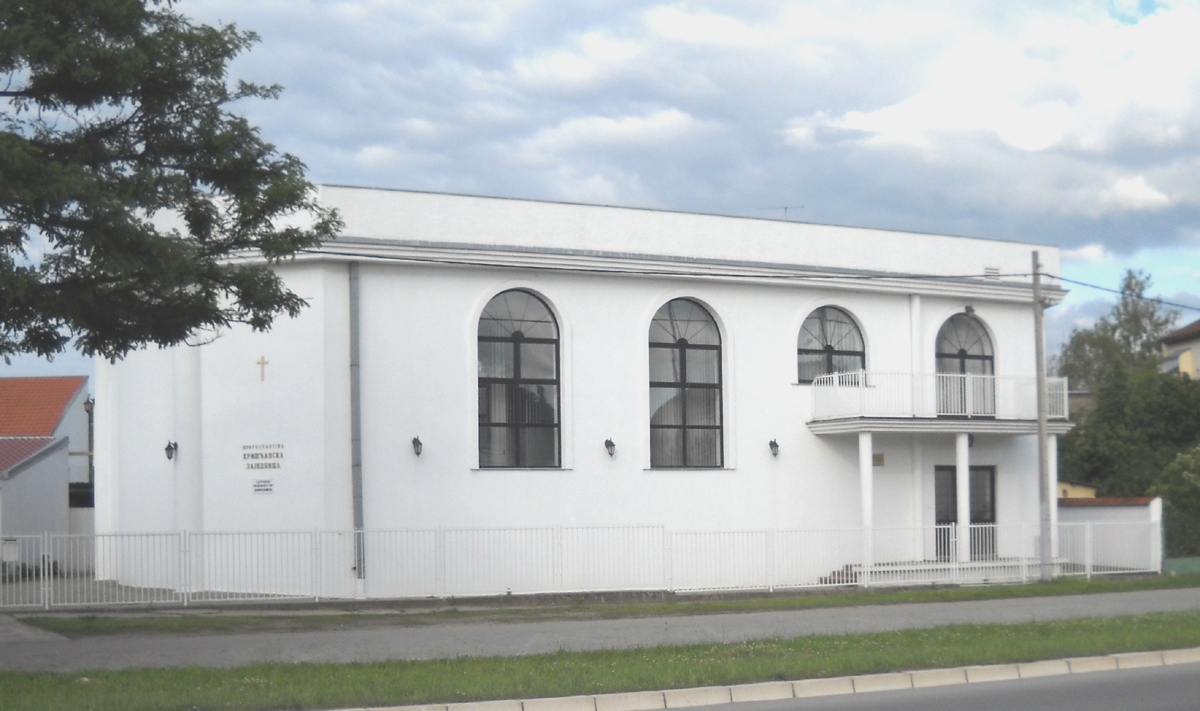
Religious building of Protestant Christian Community

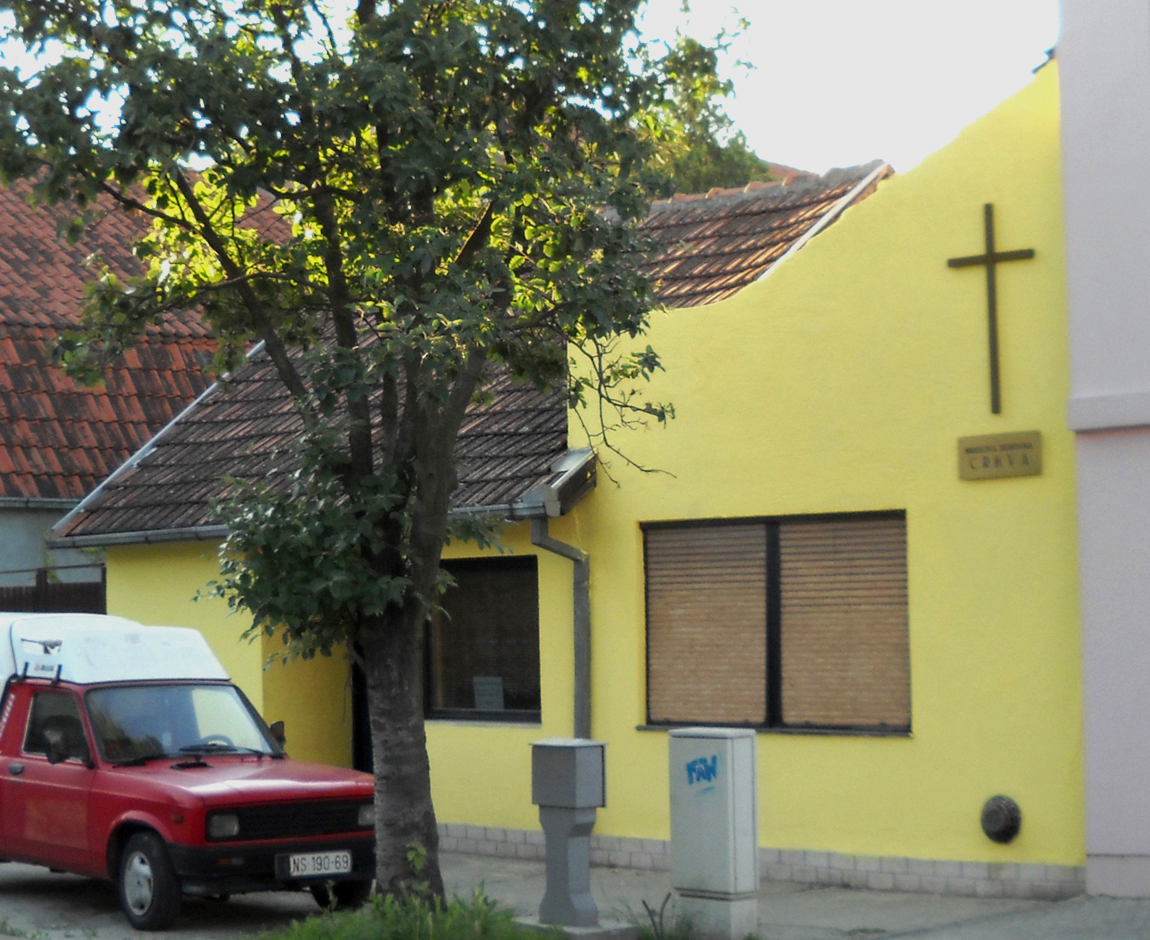
Spiritual Church of Christ

== Greek Catholic church ==
Greek Catholic church, built in 1822 and used by Rusyn ethnic community, is situated in Stari Grad.

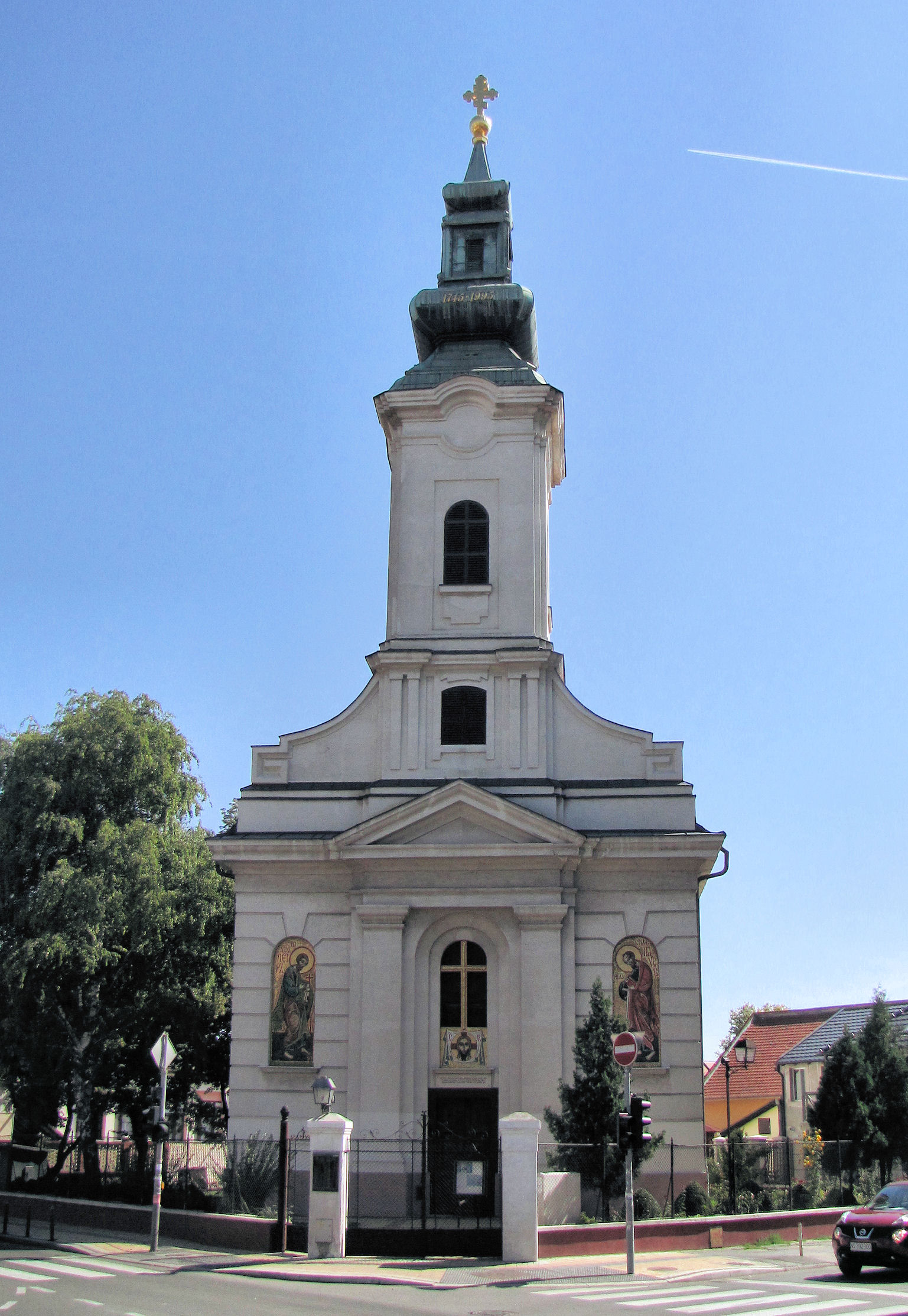
Saint Peter and Paul Uniate (Rusyn) church

== Jewish and Muslim religious buildings ==
The Novi Sad Synagogue was built in 1905 in Art Nouveau architecture. Today, the temple is not used for religious ceremonies, but it is one of the most important cultural institutions in the city. There is also a mosque located in Futoška street.

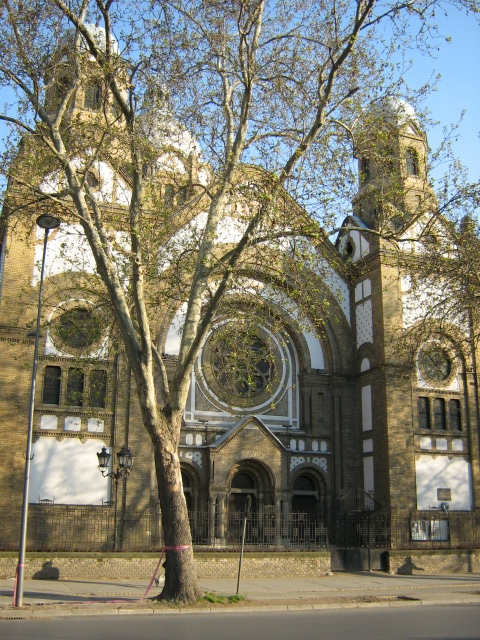
Synagogue

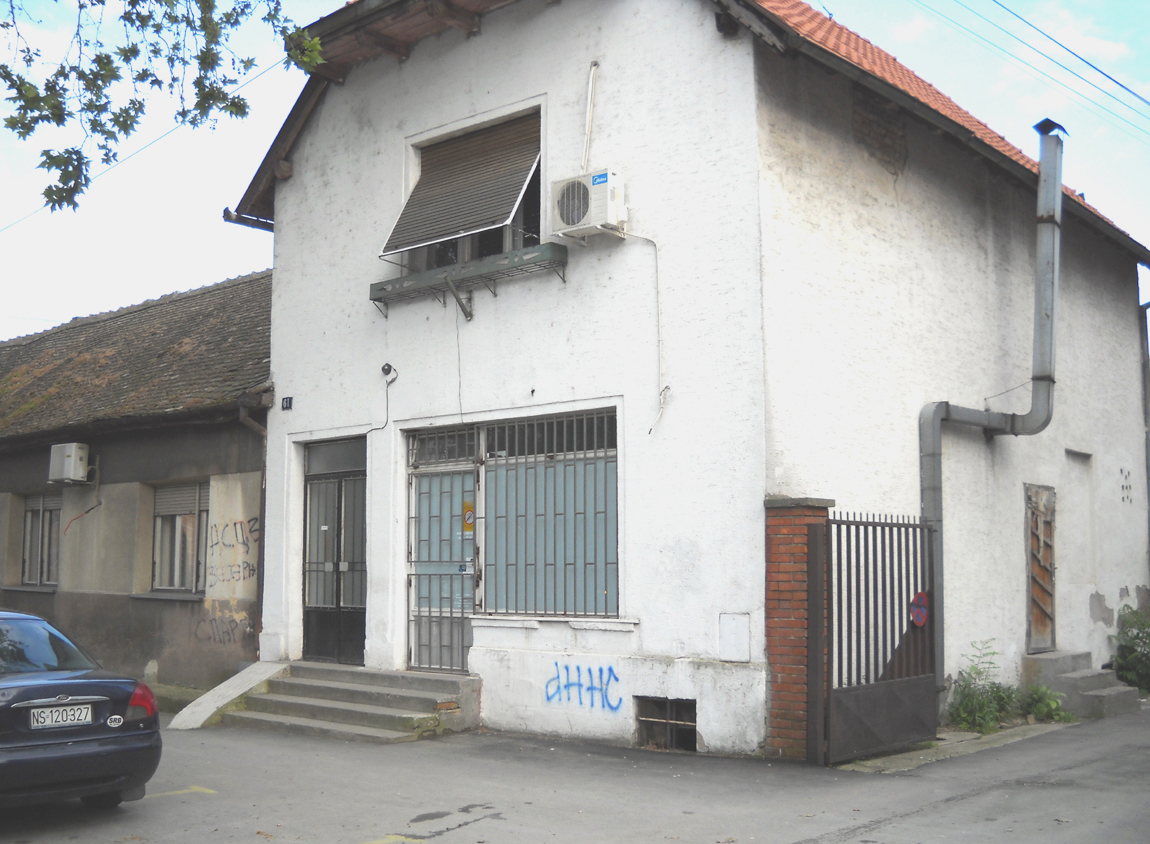
Masjid of Islamic Religious Community

== Latter-day Saints ==
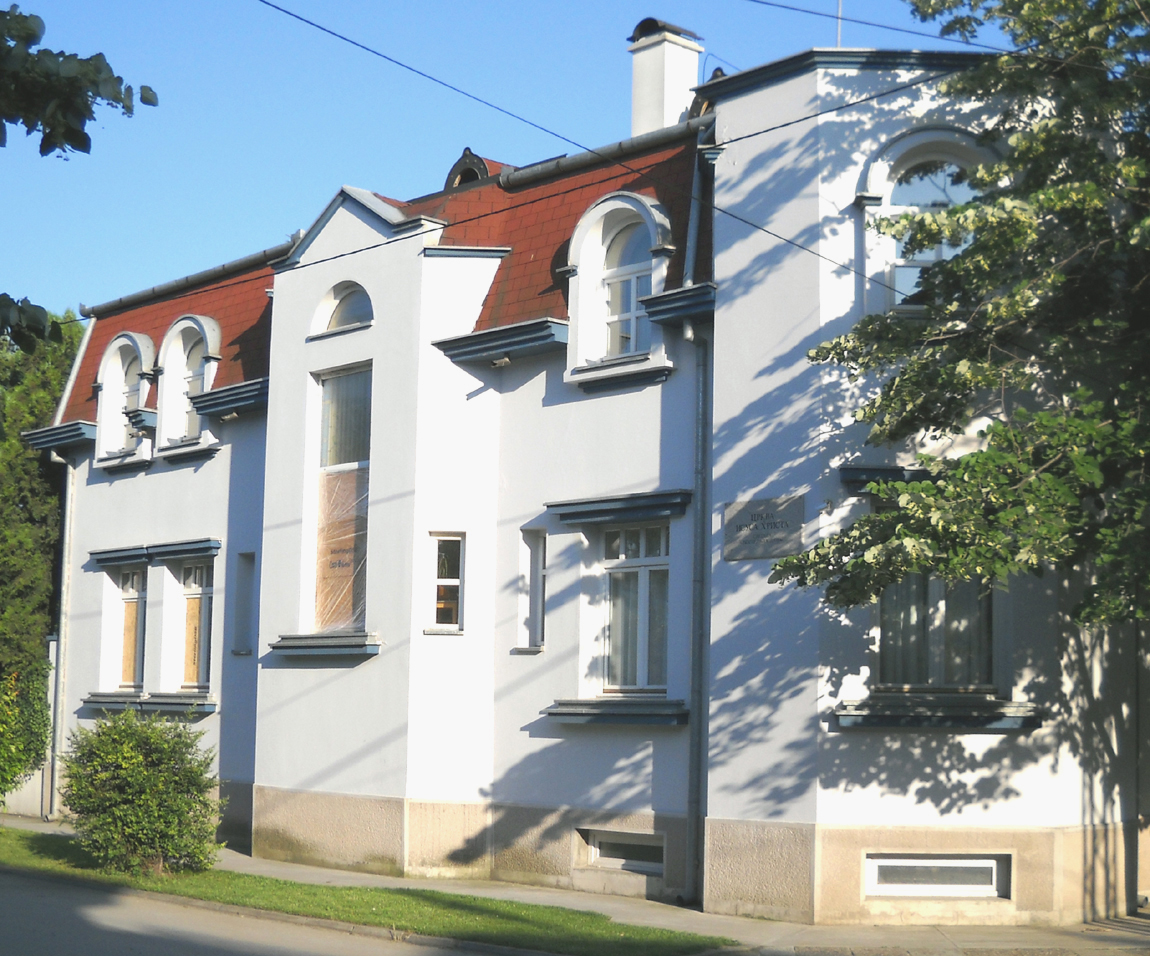
The Church of Jesus Christ of Latter-day Saints (LDS Church)

== Jehovah's Witnesses ==
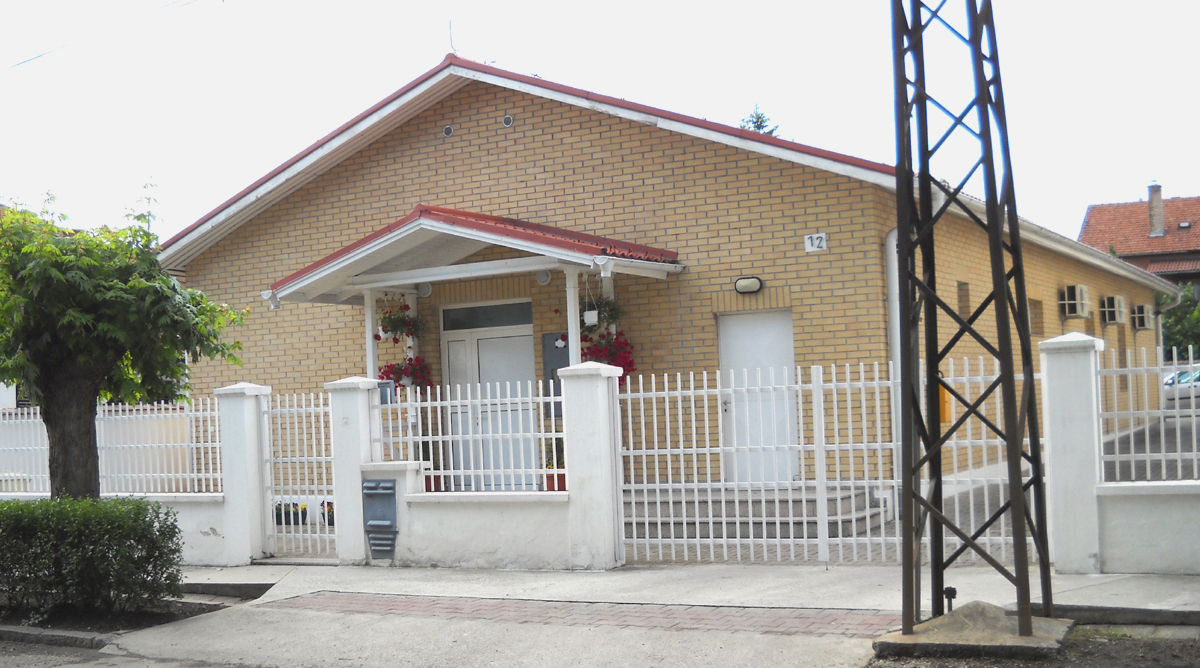
Jehovah's Witnesses prayer hall

== See also ==
- Religion in Serbia
- Religion in Vojvodina
- Famous buildings in Novi Sad
