= Serbia Fashion Week =

Fashion show in Novi Sad, Serbia

- Genre: Fashion show, exhibitions and competitions
- Frequency: Semi-annually
- Locations: Novi Sad, Serbia
- Founder: Svetlana Horvat
- Participants: Serbian and international designers, industry experts
- Attendance: 30,000/year
- Website: Official website

Serbia Fashion Week is a fashion show held twice a year in Novi Sad, Serbia. Occurring in April and November, the event attracts local and international fashion designers, such as Thierry Mugler and Anna Fendi. In addition to runway shows, seminars and exhibits, the "Fashion Talent Design Competition" helps promote young Serbian designers by showcasing their collections. The seven day festival also highlights the works of applied artists, musicians, interior decorators, multimedia experts and architects.

The fashion show portion is often held at the Congress Centre Master of the Novi Sad Fair, a multi-functional venue situated near the center of the city. Other locations are used as well, for the opening shows, concerts, and art exhibits. Each year, about 30,000 visitors attend with approximately 60 fashion designers, from 20 different countries, presenting their collections.

== About ==
Partially sponsored by the municipal government, Serbia Fashion Week was founded in 2013 by current head Svetlana Horvat. Having worked as a womenswear designer, she is also the current president of the National Serbian Chamber of Fashion. On October 31, 2013, Horvat made the fashion week official by signing the "Protocol on Cooperation" with the national Fashion Councils of eight other European countries.

The event's main objective is to present Serbian talent alongside designers from established European fashion capitals. Other goals include encouraging the local textile and manufacturing industries, as well as promoting tourism in the area.

== Highlights ==
=== SFW 2013 ===
The very first Serbia Fashion Week took place from October 31 to November 2, 2013. It featured designers from Serbia, the Netherlands, Hungary, Bulgaria, among others. French designer Eymeric François opened the show and Marcellous L. Jones, owner of "Fashion Insider TV", acted as adviser for the event. Two main themes defined the festival, High Fashion and Urban Fashion, with runway shows held at locations such as the Assembly of Vojvodina. A conference on fashion branding also took place at the assembly building. About 2,500 visitors attended the first festival in 2013. As part of the "Designer Exchange" program, local talent Biljana Tipsarević was later able to represent Serbia at Malta Fashion Week.

=== SFW 2014 ===
The special guest of honour, at the October 2014 edition, was Maastricht mayor, Onno Hoes, who participated in the Fashion Educational Conference Series. He spoke about the role of city governments in helping fashion events evolve. The opening ceremony took place at the Eđšeg chateau. Local designers, who presented their collections, included Verica Rakocević, Marija Šabić, Zvonko Marković, Bata Spasojević, and Milena Radović. That same year, Dutch designers began regularly showing their clothing lines, after a cooperation agreement between Serbia Fashion Week and FashionClash festival. Art exhibits included the works of French photographer Thomas Devaux and Serbian sculptor Vladimir Labat Rovnjev. The festival saw 14,000 visitors in 2014.

=== SFW 2015 ===
Inspired by David Bowie, one runway show in April 2015 was called "Heros" and spotlighted about 20 Serbian designers. Italian Vogue covered the event's spring edition, mentioning local talents Zorana Milicic and Marija Stankovic. French designer Eymeric François also participated, presenting his collection on the second day. A seminar on "Digital Marketing in the Fashion Industry" took place as well. At the November show, the awards ceremony was held at the Petrovaradin Fortress, with presentations made by fashion critic Marcellous L. Jones and Donald Potard, former managing director of the Jean Paul Gautier fashion house.

=== SFW 2016 ===
In 2016, Novi Sad's Popovic sisters, Mila and Tijana, focused on eco-design, by presenting garments made of recycled materials. International designers at the show included German Isabell De Hellerin and Slovenian Nika Ravnik, as well as Lesia Semi from Ukraine. Prizes were handed out at the French embassy in Belgrade, with jury members consisting of fashion expert Donald Potard and designer Anna Fendi. Fendi also visited Novi Sad to promote her new selection of wines from her AFV label. Additionally, the Novi Sad event was showcased at New York Fashion Week, featuring the collections of local designers Bata Spasojević and Marina Ilić. An exchange of designers also took place between D.C. Fashion Week and Serbia Fashion Week.

=== SFW 2017 ===
In 2017, designer Suzana Perić had a runway show noted for its boho style and local pop singer Ana Stanić performed at the festival. Italian fashion was highlighted, as well as showcasing designers from Croatia, Spain, Romania and Belarus. A new segment at the event, featuring films about fashion, was inaugurated, with cinematic works from various film festivals being shown. Additionally, a number of foreign fashion press were in attendance, including World of Fashion (Italy), Runway Manhattan (USA), Fashion Insider (USA), and El Sharkiah Magazine (Saudi Arabia). The executive director of Malta Fashion Week, Adrian Mizzi, gave out awards at the closing ceremonies, held at the Italian embassy in Belgrade. He was accompanied by Gucci Fashion House heiress, Patricia Gucci, who also signed copies of her new book, which was published in the Serbian language and examines her family's clothing empire. By 2017, the number of visitors to Serbia Fashion Week had jumped to 30,000.

=== SFW 2018 ===
In April 2018, fashion designer Thierry Mugler was the special guest and featured designer, celebrating the 10th jubilee edition of the festival. The opening ceremony took place on a giant runway in Danube Park and the awards ceremony was held at the Serbian National Theater. Designer Zvonko Marković celebrated 20 years in the fashion industry by presenting a special collection. Local pop singer Tijana Bogićević performed her Eurovision entry "In Too Deep" while wearing a 60 meter long dress. Sales advisor Barbara Locatelli and fashion editor Myra Postolache led some of the educational seminars on business and public relations. Representatives from Vancouver Fashion Week and Holland's Fashionclash show were also in attendance.

== See also ==
- Belgrade Fashion Week
- Belgrade Design Week
- The Applied Artists and Designers Association of Serbia
