= Milena Rakocević =

Serbian fashion photographer

- Occupation: Fashion photographer
- Website: http://www.milenarakocevic.com/

Milena Rakocević (Serbian Cyrillic: Милена Ракочевић) is a Serbian fashion photographer who is currently living in New York City.

== Biography ==
Rakocević has worked mainly for Serbian fashion publications, such as Elle Magazine, Grazia and Glossy. She relocated to the United States in 2012 where she photographed several fashion campaigns. In 2013, she did a fashion shoot with Serbian designer Ines Janković during her visit to New York City.

Rakocević has photographed Serbian celebrities like singers Jelena Karleuša, Ksenija Mijatović, Ana Nikolić, and Nataša Bekvalac, as well as television presenter Ana Mitić.

Rakocević studied photography at the Academy of art at Belgrade University, graduating in 2005. The photographer's mother is Verica Rakocević, a well known Serbian fashion designer. Rakocević photographed her mother's clothing line for the Serbian edition of Elle Magazine. Her sister is interior designer Elena Karaman Karić.
