= Belgrade Fashion Week =

Biannual Serbian fashion show

- Genre: Fashion show exhibitions and competitions
- Frequency: Semi-annually
- Locations: Belgrade, Serbia
- Founder: Nenad Radujević
- Participants: Serbian designers, International industry experts
- Website: http://belgradefashionweek.com/

Belgrade Fashion Week is a fashion show held in Belgrade, Serbia twice a year. It is the largest event of its kind in the country. Attracting international buyers and industry experts, the show has helped launch the careers of several Serbian fashion designers, such as George Styler, Ivana Pilja, Ana Ljubinkovic, and Boris Nikolic. British designer Roksanda Ilincic, who is originally from Serbia, has regularly presented her collections at the show since 2002. Italian Vogue has called the festival "... the most interesting platform in the Balkans for designers and international buyers".

== About ==
Belgrade Fashion Week was founded in 1996 by Nenad Radujević who is also the festival's director. The first fashion week to be held in Eastern Europe, it is supported by local media sponsorship and companies such as Textil distribution center and Matrix hair salons. Belgrade Fashion Week takes place twice a year, at the end of October and in March, and lasts about two weeks. It is mainly held at the Belexpocentar, a conference hall located in New Belgrade. Other venues are also employed, such as various galleries for the "Fashion and Art" segment or the Museum of Applied Arts for accompanying exhibitions.

The primary goal of the event is to support local talent and young designers by promoting them in Serbia, as well as internationally, and also by combining the artistic and commercial aspects of fashion. The show also presents designers from Croatia, Slovenia and Macedonia in the "Fashion Scout SEE" contest, which is judged by European fashion industry experts.

== Highlights ==
Belgrade Fashion Week features numerous activities that are related to the fashion industry. In 2006, students from Belgrade's Academy of Fine Arts were asked to present their designs. In 2009, a one-off competition was held to design the uniforms of the pavilion staff representing Serbia at Expo 2010 Shanghai. In 2012, Belgrade Fashion Week launched project "Zone 45", aimed at showcasing the best designers from the surrounding countries and further developing a fashion scene in the region. In 2014, Indian designer Manish Arora was a special guest at the show, with the support of the Indian Embassy in Belgrade, Etihad Airways and Air Serbia.

The "Fashion Scout SEE" competition was introduced in 2017. The jury consisted of British fashion editor Hilary Alexander, the Italian director of Rome's "Academia Costume e Moda" Adrien Yakimov Roberts, and Martyn Roberts who founded London's Fashion Scout showcase. The winner, Serbian designer Nevena Ivanovic, got to compete in London Fashion Week's "Ones to Watch" program, a contest that supports emerging designers. According to Hilary Alexander, the event "...raises the profile of fashion for the whole region – with the winner being awarded the opportunity to show on the catwalk during London Fashion Week and thus potentially be seen by press and buyers from the UK, US, Asia and Europe".

In 2017, the show introduced "BFW Choice", a new concept in sales that supports local designers through pop-up shops. In 2018, Belgrade Fashion Week had a special show featuring local designers whose clothing lines were purchased by Serbian department store Martini Vesto. Serbian pop singer Ana Stanic performed during the show wearing one of the mentioned designs.

In 2018, several designers from the Belgrade show were profiled at London Fashion Week, in an event called "Belgrade Fashion Week Showcase". In addition, Serbian womenswear designer Ana Ljubinkovic presented her collection in London's "Ones to Watch" contest.

In 2018, the Belgrade Fashion Week commemorated Serbian fashion designer Boris Nikolic who had died ten years earlier. An award is also named in his honour.

== Competition prizes ==
The following prizes are handed out at each Belgrade Fashion Week:

- Boris Nikolić Award
- Belgrade Fashion Week Special Prize
- Bazart Award for Best Collection
- Award for Style Personality
- Textile Young Designer Award
- Best Model BFW
- Best Male Model BFW
- Beauty and Health Prize for Best Make-up
- Beauty and Health Prize for Best Hairstyle
- Wannabe Magazine Award for Best Digital Presentation
- Insta Shot Award for Young Photographers
- Gloria Glam Award

== Serbian designers ==
- Roksanda Ilincic
- Aleksandra Lalić
- Ivana Pilja
- Ana Ljubinković
- Nevena Ivanović, fashion brand "NEO Design"
- Evica Milovanov-Penezic
- Boris Nikolić
- Ines Janković
- Sonja Jocić
- Marijana Matthäus
- Bojana Sentaler
- Ana Kras
- George Styler
- Zoran Ladicorbic
- Daniel Vosovic
- Gorjana Reidel
- Jelena Behrend
- Ana Rajcevic
- Melina Džinović, fashion brand "Hamel"
- Aleksandar Protić
- Ana Šekularac
- Verica Rakocević
- Ivana Sert
- Mihailo Anušić, fashion brand "Mihano Momosa"
- Bata Spasojević
- Zvonko Marković

== See also ==
- Serbia Fashion Week
- London Fashion Week
- Belgrade Design Week
- The Applied Artists and Designers Association of Serbia
