= Daniela Komatović =

Czech graphic designer, photographer and painter

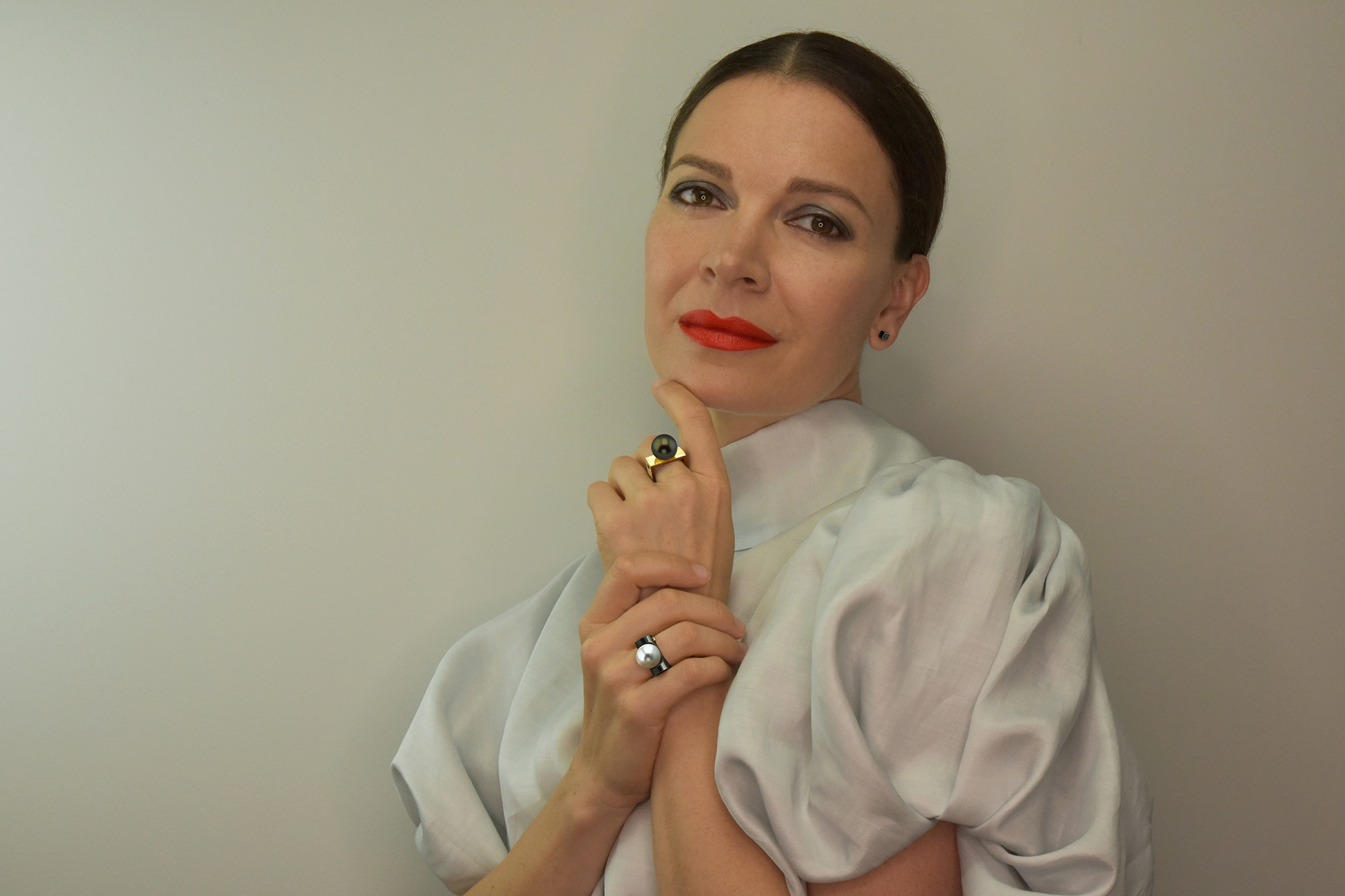
- Born: Krákorová; January 18, 1976 (age 50); Prague
- Citizenship: Czech
- Occupations: jewellery designer, graphic designer, photographer, painter
- Awards: Gold Award, A’ Design Award and Competition in 2017

Daniela Komatović (born 1976, Prague) is a Czech jewellery designer, graphic designer, photographer and painter.

== Career ==
Komatović was born in Prague, Czechoslovakia, where she studied graphic design at the Professional School of Applied Art. As a graphic designer she worked for companies Clinique, Estée Lauder, Nestlé, Harper's Bazaar, Vienna International Hotels, and many Czech companies. She created visual identity of brands YU Diamond Center, SRJ Europe and Diamond Spot jewellery store. Komatović and her husband wrote a popular cookbook of balkan cuisine – Balkánská kuchyně in 2001. Komatović provided the book with original photographs and drawings. Since 2018 she is face of private banking brand Friedrich Wilhelm Raiffeisen of Czech Raiffeisenbank.

== Personal life ==
Daniela Komatović lives in Prague and Belgrade. Her husband works as gemologist and they have two children.

== Exhibitions ==
- Karátové Duše – International exhibition of jewellery and history of goldsmith, Technical Museum in Brno. Brno, May–July 2019.
- Prague Design Week – International design exhibition. Prague, May 2018.
- A'Design Awards Winners' Exhibition, "MOOD" Ex Chiesa di San Francesco. Como, July 2017.
- Belgrade Fashion Week. Belgrade, April 2016.
- Diamond Spot Belgrade, jeweller. Belgrade, 2016.
- Belgrade Fashion Week. Belgrade, October 2016.
- Belgrade Fashion Week. Belgrade, October 2015.
- Diamond Spot Belgrade, jeweller. Belgrade, April 2015.
