= Rakočević =

Rakočević (Serbian Cyrillic: Ракочевић) is a Serbian surname, derived from the name Rakoč. It may refer to:

- Igor Rakočević, Serbian basketball player; son of Goran Rakočević
- Goran Rakočević, Serbian basketball player; father of Igor Rakočević
- Darko Rakočević (born 1981), Serbian footballer
- Žarko Rakočević, Montenegrin basketball player
- Nikola Rakočević, Serbian actor
- Verica Rakocević, Serbian fashion designer
