= Evica Milovanov-Penezic =

Serbian glove designer

- Occupation: Fashion designer
- Known for: Leather gloves

Evica Milovanov-Penezic is a Serbian glove designer known for her fringes, cutouts and use of vibrant colors.

== Biography ==
Penezic started off as a clothing and handbag designer but switched to leather gloves in 1997 while living in Germany. Noticing the limited variety of glove styles, she began creating new designs with embroidery and decorations. Penezic creates her pieces by hand, relying on traditional methods. The handmade approach contributes to the uniqueness of each pair of gloves.

She had her first exhibit at a Belgrade fair and has presented collections in Paris several times. She also had several solo shows like the 2011 exhibition at the Ethnographic Museum in Serbia. A Hong Kong exhibit garnered her an award in 2010. Her work has been seen at the Belgrade Fashion Week accessories show and has appeared in fashion publications like Serbian Elle Magazine. She also presented her glove designs at the 8th International Exhibition of "Wearable Art". Her leather gloves are worn by royals like Kate Middleton, as well as singers Deborah Harry and Kelis.

Penezic collaborates with clothing designers like Roksanda Ilincic and Ana Šekularac for their runway shows. She also designs for operas, as well as theater and movie productions, such as the Serbian film "St. George Shoots the Dragon". Her gloves can be found in boutiques in several European cities. She is a member of "The Applied Artists and Designers Association of Serbia" and currently sits on its arts council. She has two daughters.
