= Nevena Ivanović =

Serbian fashion designer

- Occupation: Fashion designer
- Known for: NEO design
- Website: https://www.neodesign.rs

Nevena Ivanović (Serbian Cyrillic: Невена Ивановић, born 16 March 1992) is a Serbian fashion designer behind the brand NEO Design. The label is known for being inspired by Japanese culture and hairstyles, as well as African and Balkan fashion. According to Italian Vogue, Ivanović "... knows how to use different fabrics and textures in an elaborate and fascinating way, including lace, neoprene, stretch materials, chiffon and leather, thus creating a modern, futuristic yet feminine and intriguing silhouette."

== Biography ==
Ivanović first studied industrial design and later fashion design at the Faculty of Arts and Design in Belgrade. In 2014, while still in school, she began the clothing line PINS, with three other students, and was also part of several group shows at Belgrade Fashion Week. The joint venture PINS dissolved, which had Ivanović launching her own label, NEO Design, just prior to graduating in Spring 2016. Gaining local and European recognition in a relatively short time, she presented her first solo collection in Paris in September 2016. That same year, she won the BazArt and Textile Designer awards at Belgrade Fashion Week, as well as winning Belgrade's ELLE magazine award which let her participate in the international ELLE competition. In 2016, she was also awarded the prize for most talented designer in the "Fashion Talent Design" competition at Serbia Fashion Week.

In March 2017, Ivanović won the Fashion Scout SEE award at Belgrade Fashion Week, allowing her to present at London Fashion Week, as part of the Fashion Scout "Ones to Watch" segment. That same year she also participated in the menswear WoolMark prize competition in Milan, as well as presenting collections at Ljubljana Fashion Week and Fashionclash Festival in the Netherlands. She also won the "Belgrade Fashion Week Special Prize" at the October installment of Belgrade Fashion Week in 2017.

In addition to designing her collections, Ivanović works as a stylist, art director, and costume designer. In 2017, she styled an editorial piece for Serbia's Wannabe Magazine and also designed costumes for singer Luke Black's music video "Olive Tree". The following year, Ivanović designed the costumes, done mostly in black and white, for musician Sanja Ilić and his band Balkanika, Serbia's entry for the 2018 Eurovision song contest.

For Ivanović, her label NEO Design also acts as an art initiative, through projects such as her unisex Atehneo collection. A related photography series documents how dancers interpret the mythology of the Khazar people, while wearing clothing from the fashion collection. When doing art direction and styling fashion shoots, she also tries to present fashion through art, as well as the reverse, interpreting art through fashion. Ivanović states that she is inspired by anything deemed fascinating, while in the process of creating clothing or photographs, such as the "... cultures of distant nations, the status of a woman, new technologies, interesting scientific facts, traditions, music, and dreams."
