= Anušić =

Anušić is a surname. Notable people with the surname include:

- Tadija Anušić (1896–1942), Yugoslav Partisan
- Zdenka Anušić (1936–2012), Croatian actress
- Anđelko Anušić (born 1953), Serbian author, critic, journalist and publicist
- Ivan Anušić (born 1973), Croatian Minister of Defence
- Dalibor Anušić (born 1976), Croatian handball player and coach
- Mihailo Anušić (born 1985), Serbian fashion designer
