= Central Credit Institute Building =

- Зграда Централног кредитног завода
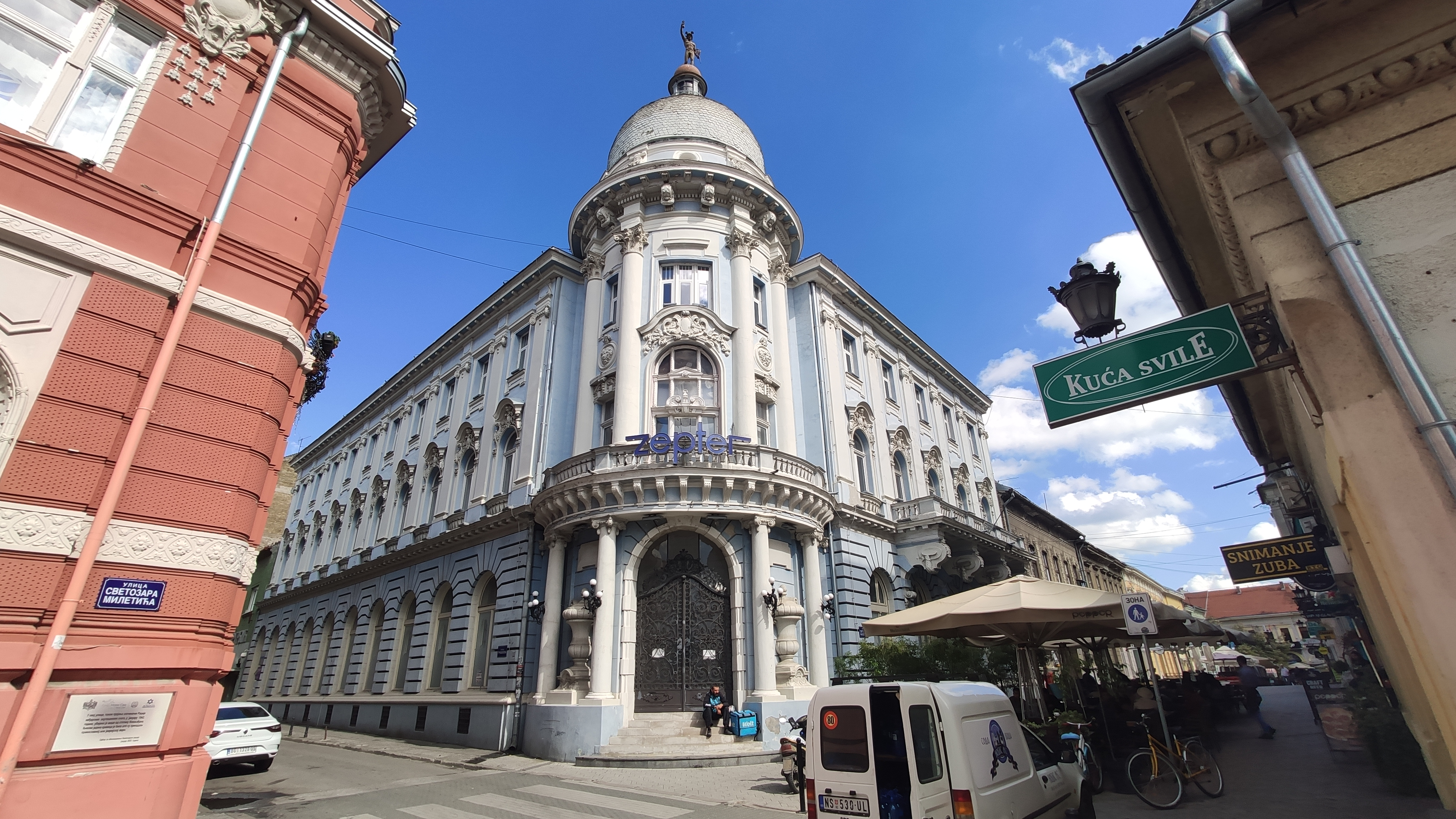
- A view of the Central Credit Institute Building

General information
- Architectural style: Historicism
- Location: Novi Sad, Serbia

Design and construction
- Architects: Frantz Voruda and Đorđe Jovanović

The Central Credit Institute Building (Serbian Cyrillic: Зграда Централног кредитног завода) is a historic building located at 2 Grčkoškolska Street in Novi Sad, Serbia. Completed in 1896, it is notable for its architecture and the distinctive statue of the Roman god Mercury on its dome, which overlooks the city.

== History ==
The building was constructed in 1896 as the headquarters for the Central Credit Institute, reflecting the growing economic and financial importance of Novi Sad during the late 19th century within the Austro-Hungarian Empire. The architectural project was designed by Frantz Voruda and Đorđe Jovanović.

== Architecture ==
Built in the historicist style characteristic of the period, the structure features ornate facade details and an imposing dome. The most prominent artistic element of the building is the statue of Mercury—the Roman god of financial gain, commerce, and communication—which stands atop the central dome, gazing out over the cityscape.

== See also ==
- List of buildings in Novi Sad
- Architecture of Serbia
