= Aleksandra Lalić =

Serbian fashion designer

- Occupation: Fashion designer
- Known for: label LalicA
- Notable work: Dress made of recycled human hair
- Website: https://www.instagram.com/lalicabg/

Aleksandra Lalić (Cyrillic: Александра Лалић) is a Serbian fashion designer who relies on structural tailoring and abstract configurations. She is well known in her native country for creating experimental clothing such as dresses made of human hair.

== Career ==
Under the label "LalicA", the designer has produced her clothing line since 2002. According to Fashion Reverie, Lalić "represents a continuing trend in European fashion of re-imaging and re-inventing the way consumers and industry professionals consider form, structure, fabrication, and wearability."

In 2012, she presented a collection at Modepalast, a fashion show which took place at the Museum of Applied Arts in Vienna. She also participated in the 2014 "Bending the Borders" multimedia exhibition in Belgrade, Serbia. Her 2016 show at Belgrade Fashion Week paid homage to Oskar Schlemmer, a German artist who created costumes for the theater. Using natural fibers like wool and silk, the clothing was characterized by abstract designs and tailored shapes. That same year, a second collection was inspired by the Mediterranean, in its use of oceanic blues and the traditional black clothing worn there. Lalic also created an all red collection for the Hemofarm Foundation, as part of a special project sponsored by Belgrade Fashion Week. Her 2017 line was described as " all smooth lines and earthy colours, a subtle mix of contemporary style and traditional references". In 2018, she participated in a group tribute to Boris Nikolić at Belgrade Fashion Week.

Lalić has become known for creating experimental dresses made of felt from human hair. She uses hair that had been cut-off or rejected, as part of a habitual beauty routine. By re-purposing the hair, the designer views the transformed material as returning "... to the body in the form of clothing as an undesirable surface".
