= Sonja Jocić =

Serbian fashion designer (born 1988)

- Occupation: Fashion designer
- Known for: Sustainable fashion and origami shapes
- Website: https://www.sonjajocic.com/

Sonja Jocić (Serbian Cyrillic: Соња Јоцић; born 1988) is a Serbian fashion designer known for her origami shapes, draped layering, and androgynous silhouettes, as well as for creating sustainable fashion. Her work is described as having a Scandinavian minimalism that contrasts black and white tones, also playing "... at the border of clothing and sculpture."

== Background ==
Born in Belgrade, Jocić lived in Spain as a child. In 2010, she graduated with a bachelor's degree in fashion design from Belgrade's "Textile College of Applied Studies in Design, Technology and Management". She then studied at the University of Borås's "Swedish School of Textiles", obtaining a master's degree in Fashion Design in 2014. During her time in Sweden, Jocić also had internship at the Swedish label "Fifth Avenue Shoe Repair" in Stockholm. She assisted with photo shoots and helped prepare mock-ups for the 2012 womenswear and menswear collections.

== Career ==
Jocić launched her namesake label in 2013. In 2014, she was featured in Serbian Elle Magazine, as one of the young designers to watch out for. Since then, she has presented at Belgrade Fashion Week several times. In 2015, she showcased T-shirts that could be worn in multiple ways, which the designer calls “fashion collage”. The collection also featured layered skirts and translucent tops, as well as one stand out piece, "...an all-in-black costume composed of an asymmetrical coat and a pair of Marlene Dietrich-style pants." In 2016, she presented black, red and white outfits that mixed traditional fabrics, like wool and silk, with rubber, PVC and other non-traditional materials. To bring awareness about sustainable fashion, her 2017 collection was called "Zero Percent" and relied on reducing fabric waste. In 2018, she participated in the "Fashion Scout See" portion of Belgrade Fashion Week. Italian Vogue described her use of light layered fabrics as creating "... disproportionate, light silhouettes, especially in the movement, allowing the garments to come to life." In 2018, Jocić also presented a runway show at "Mercedes-Benz Fashion Week", held in Ljubljana.

Described as having a style defined by contrast, Jocić mixes opposing colors, fabrics and forms. In order to reduce fabric waste, she uses draped layering and precise pattern cutting, as well as following the principles of origami paper folding. The fabrics are folded into 3D shapes creating a sculptural effect.

Jocić has won several awards at Belgrade Fashion Week, including the "Boris Nikolic Award", the "Textile Designer Award", and the "BazArt Award". Other prizes from the Serbian fashion scene include the "Harper's Bazaar Award" and the "ELLE Fashion Award". In 2017, she also won the "Best International Designer Award" at the "Gombold Ujra! Central Europe" competition, which is part of Budapest Central European Fashion Week held in Hungary Her winning collection incorporated silk, wool and cotton fabrics accentuated by details made of wood.

A former contemporary dancer, Jocić also worked as a theater costume designer prior to working in high fashion.
