= Ivana Pilja =

- Occupation: Fashion designer
- Known for: Futuristic avant-garde designs
- Website: https://www.ivanapilja.com/

Ivana Pilja (Serbian Cyrillic: Ивана Пиља) is a fashion designer based out of Belgrade, Serbia. She is known for her avant-garde designs, accentuated by angular edges, architectural shapes and unexpected patterns. Italian Vogue has called her "One of Belgrade's greatest talents..."

== Career ==
Pilja is a graduate of the College of Textile, Fashion and Marketing in Belgrade, Serbia. In 2007, she began working for various commercial sports clothing brands while at the same time creating her own label. In 2010, her namesake collection won two awards at Belgrade Fashion Week and was also shown at FashionClash in the Netherlands, which helped launch her brand internationally. Her clothes have been seen at London Fashion Week, Berlin Fashion Week, and runway shows in Dubai. She presented at Berlin Alternative Fashion Week in 2015 and again two years later. The 2017 collection was described as having an extreme look with voluminous geometric shapes. Singer Luke Black made an appearance during the runway show.

For Pilja, clothing is like a moving sculpture and she is inspired by Japanese fashion. Described as being futuristic, her brand has attracted celebrities such as Dita von Teese, Ellie Goulding, Lily Allen, Daisy Lowe, and Paloma Faith. Pilja has won several awards from Elle magazine. Her work has also been featured in British Vogue, Italian Vogue and the 2011 book "Fast Forward Fashion", published by Farameh Media.
