= Ana Ljubinković =

Serbian fashion designer

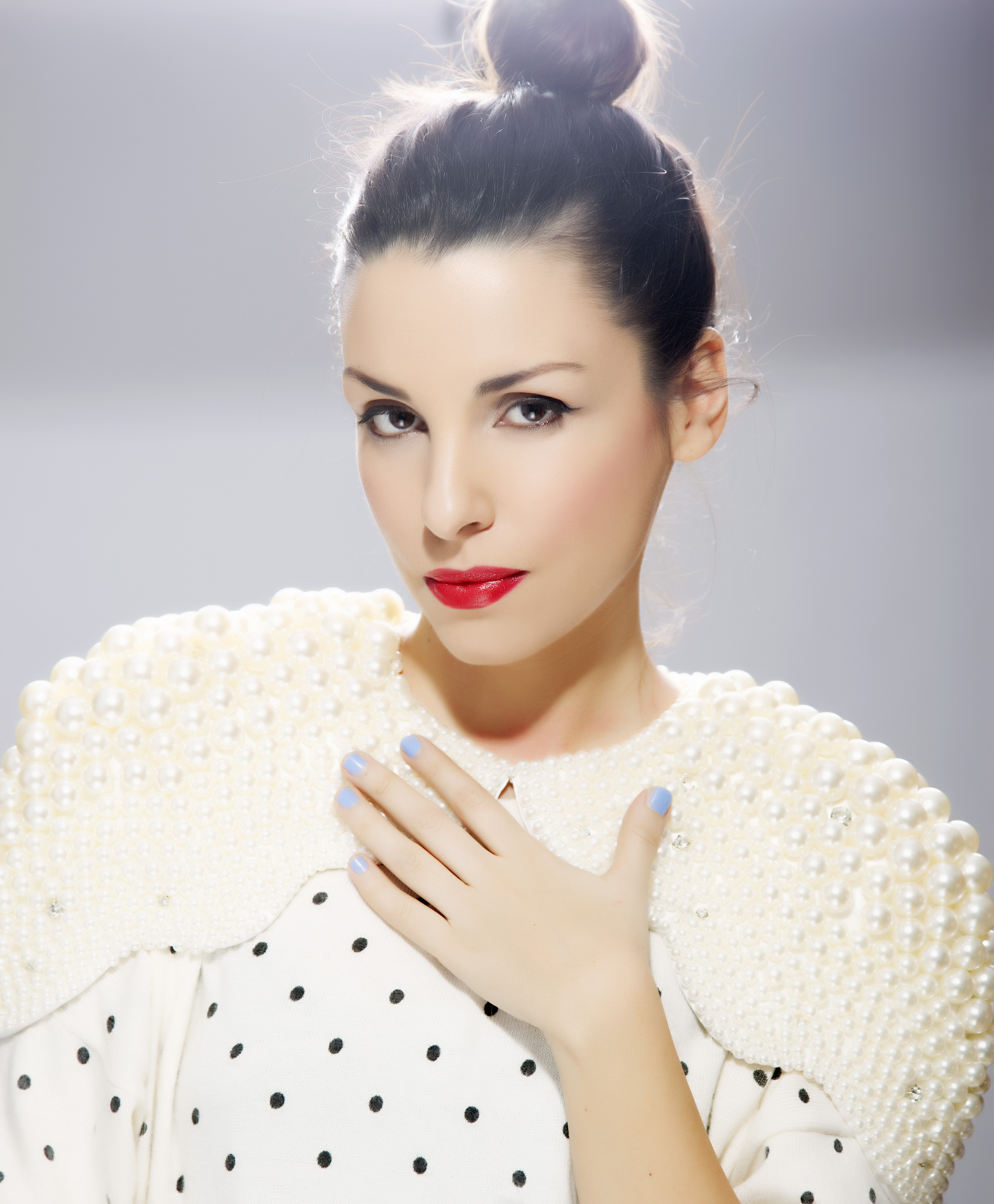
- 2013 portrait
- Occupation: Fashion designer
- Known for: Retro-futuristic couture designs
- Website: https://www.ana-ljubinkovic.com/

Ana Ljubinković (Serbian Cyrillic: Ана Љубинковић; born 1985) is a Serbian fashion designer known for clothing that merges "... comic, retro-futuristic and couture elements together". Her designs have been worn by musicians, including Lady Gaga.

== Career ==
Ljubinković studied painting at the University of Belgrade and graduated with a bachelor's in fine art in 2002. She had her first runway show in 2004 at Belgrade Fashion Week and has since participated numerous times, winning several awards. In 2006, she opened the Peekaboo shop with fellow Serbian designer Boris Nikolic.

In 2015, Ljubinković presented her collection at Mercedes Benz Fashion Week Central Europe in Budapest. She was also part of "Belgrade Fashion Week Showcase" in 2015, where a group of Serbian designers participated in the Fashion Scout segment at London Fashion Week. Ljubinković had another runway show at London's Fashion Scout in 2016 where she won the Best Young Designer award.

In 2017, she presented a collection in Belgrade that had vintage photos, postcards and stamps printed on the fabric. According to the designer, she is "... interested in this old documentation that reflects a life that no longer exists, ..." In 2018, Avon held a "Little Black Dress" contest in Serbia with the prize being a Ljubinković creation.

Ljubinković's work has appeared in Italian Vogue, British Vogue and countless Serbian publications. Her clothes have been worn by celebrities like Lady Gaga, Tallia Storm and Miley Cyrus. According to Ljubinković, "My fashion is always something between fashion design and art and that's why I think I can always awaken emotions in the audience too."

Ljubinković's sister Iva is a local shoe designer who graduated with a degree in architecture.

== Gallery ==
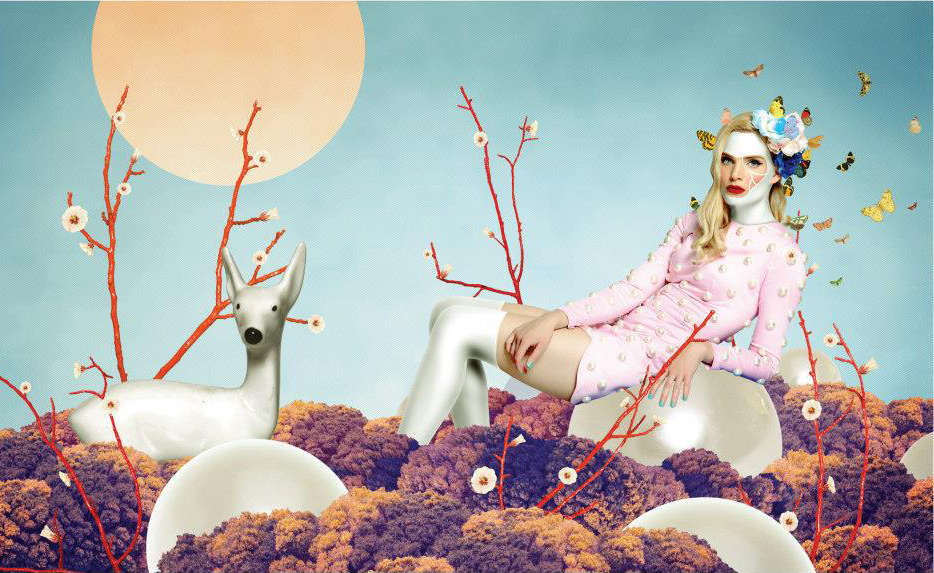
Pearl dress

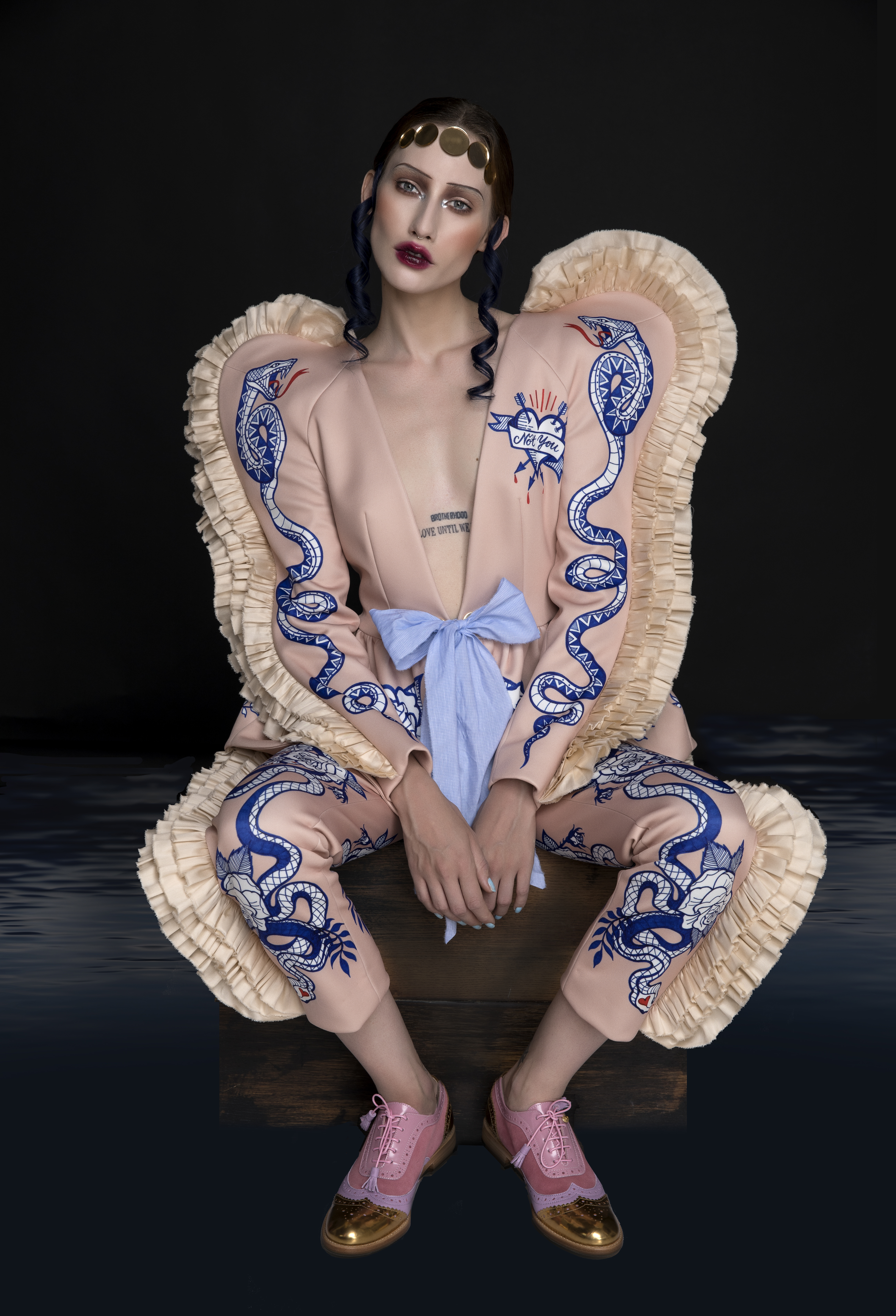
Autumn/Winter collection 2017-18
