= George Styler =

American fashion designer

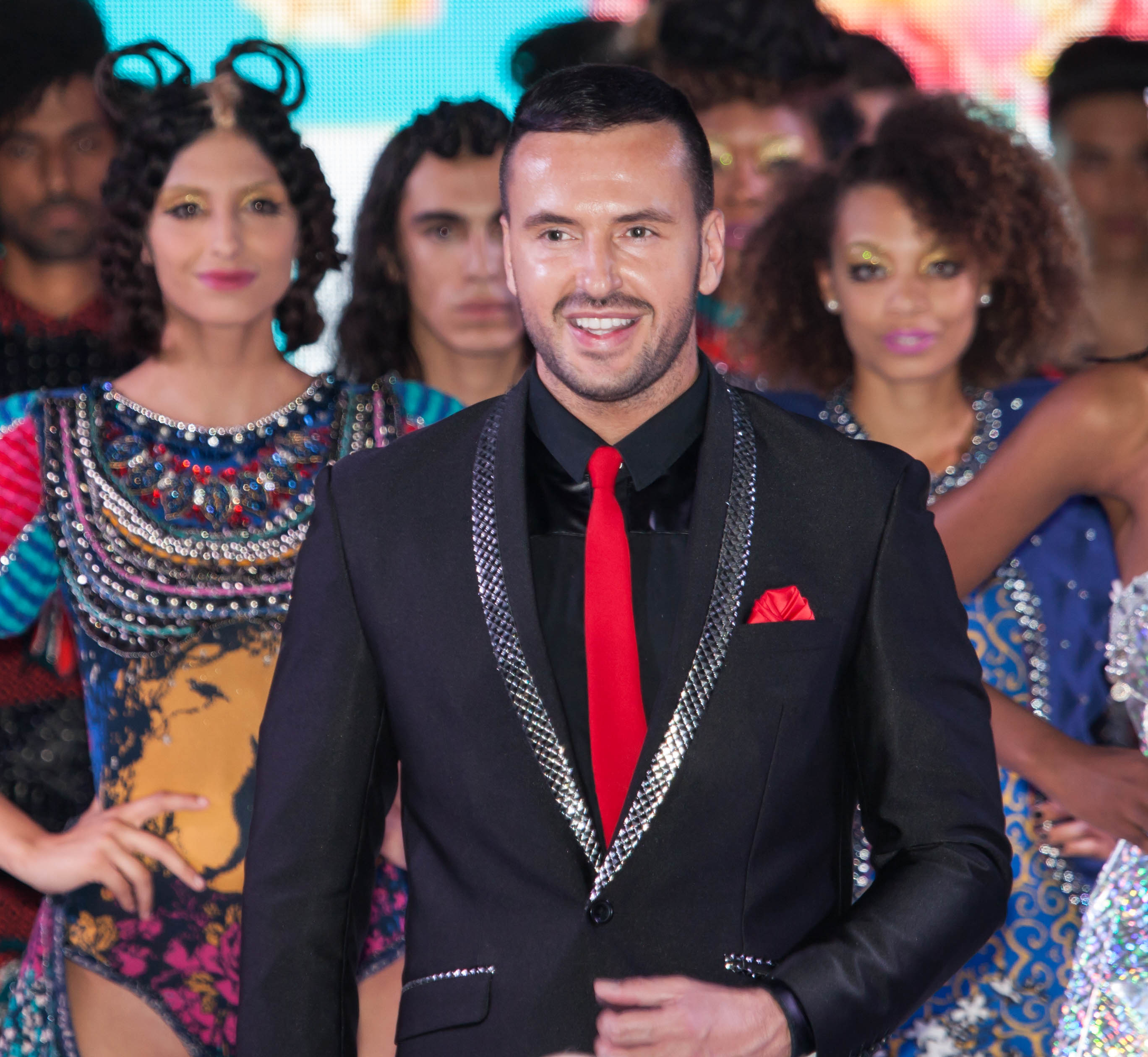
- Styler at New York Fashion Week, 2018
- Occupation: Fashion designer
- Known for: Colourful ethno-look knitwear
- Website: https://georgestyler.com/

George Styler (Serbian Cyrillic: Ђорђе Тамбурић; born Đorđe Tamburić) is a Los Angeles–based fashion designer originally from Serbia known for his ethno-look knitwear. His clients include Nicki Minaj, Rita Ora, Gloria Trevi, George Clinton, Sara Jovanović, Nikolija ...

== Biography ==
Styler graduated from the Textile College of Applied Studies in Design, Technology and Management in Belgrade, Serbia.

== Work ==
Specializing in knitwear, Styler's designs have been described as colorful with a multicultural flair. His inspirations are varied, deriving from nature, architecture, fairy tales, flora and fauna. According to Styler, "Every day is a fashion show and the world is your runway."

Styler's line of clothing has been presented at London Fashion Week, LA Fashion Week, Expo 2015 Milan, the Fashionclash Festival, Seattle Fashion Week, Scottsdale Fashion Week, Vancouver Fashion Week, and Belgrade Fashion Week. His clothes were also recently presented at New York Fashion Week in February 2018 and one of his designs made the cover of Brazil's Vogue magazine in January of the same year.

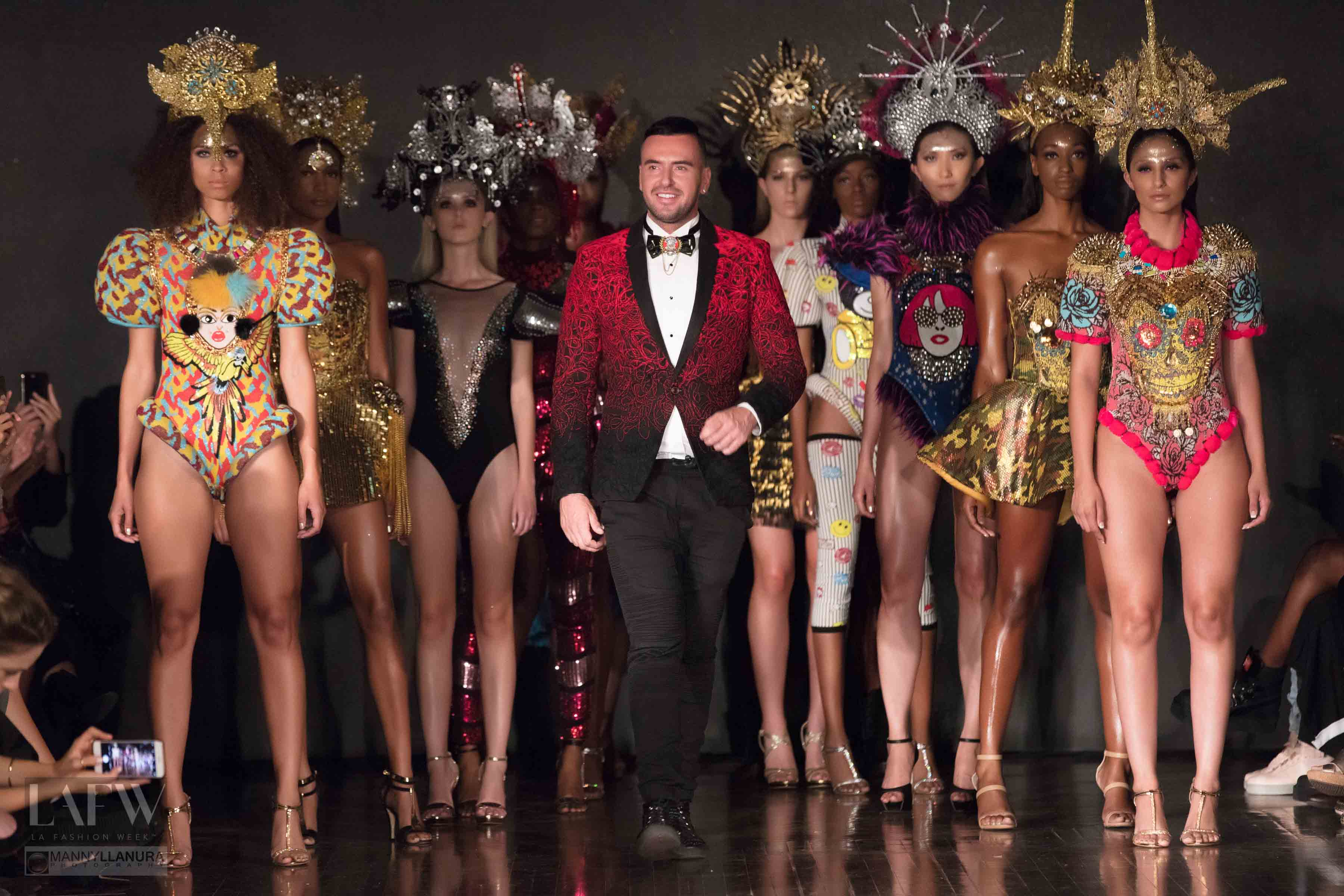
LA Fashion Week, 2017

== Awards ==
- 2012: Fashion Show Award (BazART Award) at Belgrade Fashion Week.
- 2014: "Ones to Watch" award at London Fashion Week
- 2014: Knitwear King prize by the magazine Machine Knitting Monthly.
- 2018: Best Couture Designer Award by Fashion Community Week, San Francisco
