= List of buildings in Novi Sad =

Following is a list of buildings in Novi Sad, Serbia.

== Historical buildings ==
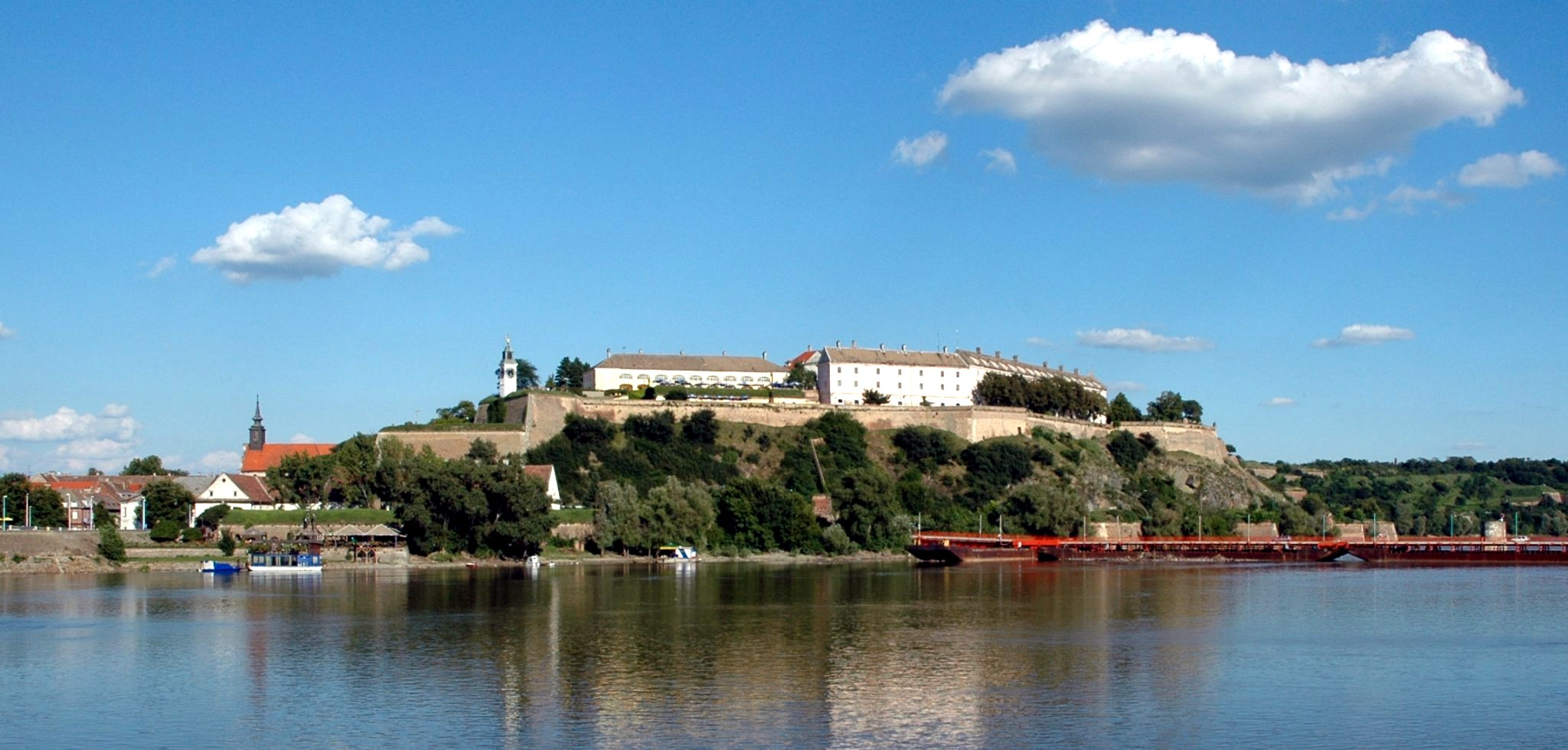
Petrovaradin fortress

- Petrovaradin fortress
- Clock Tower

== Administrative buildings ==
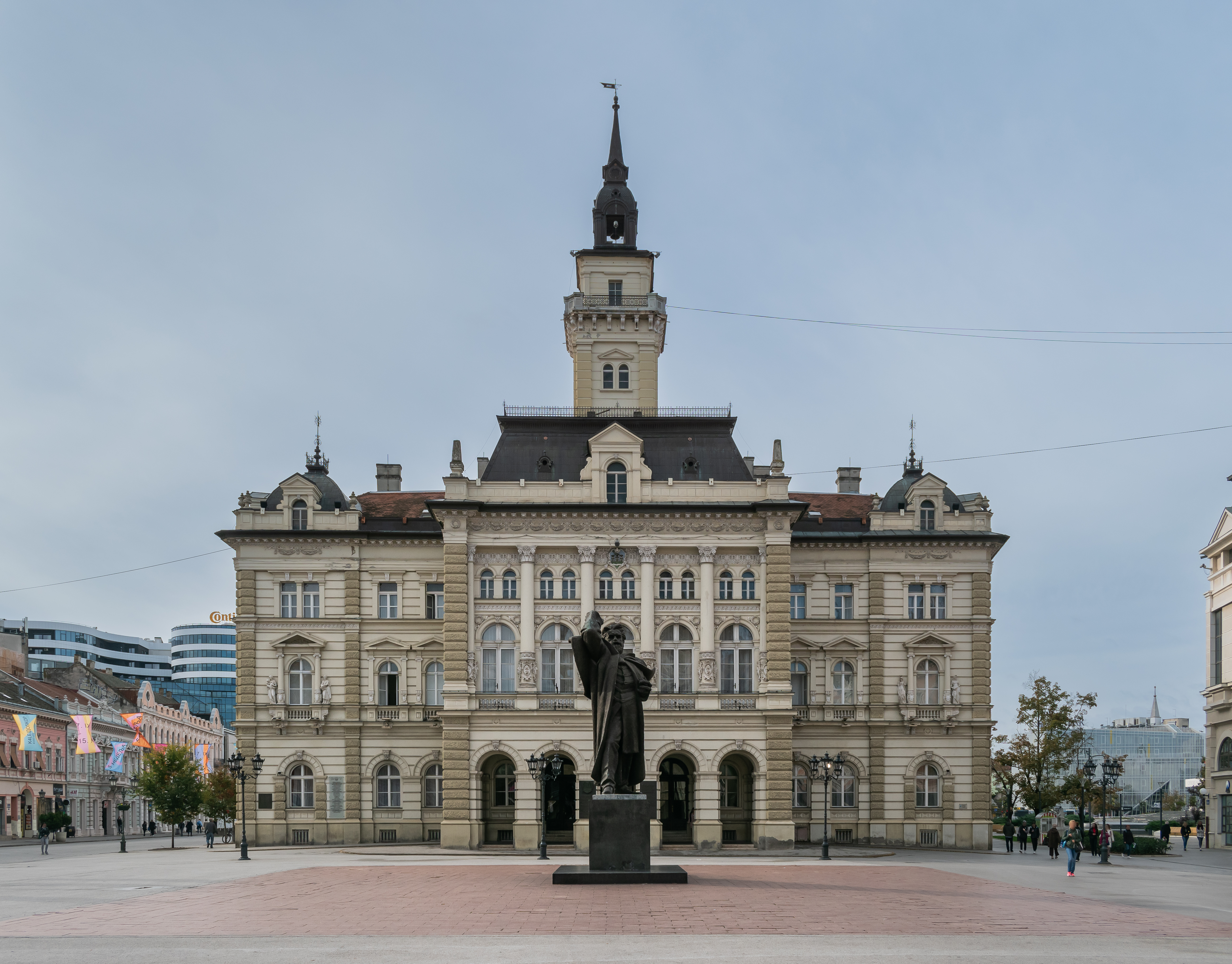
City hall

- City Hall
- Banovina Palace

== Cultural buildings ==
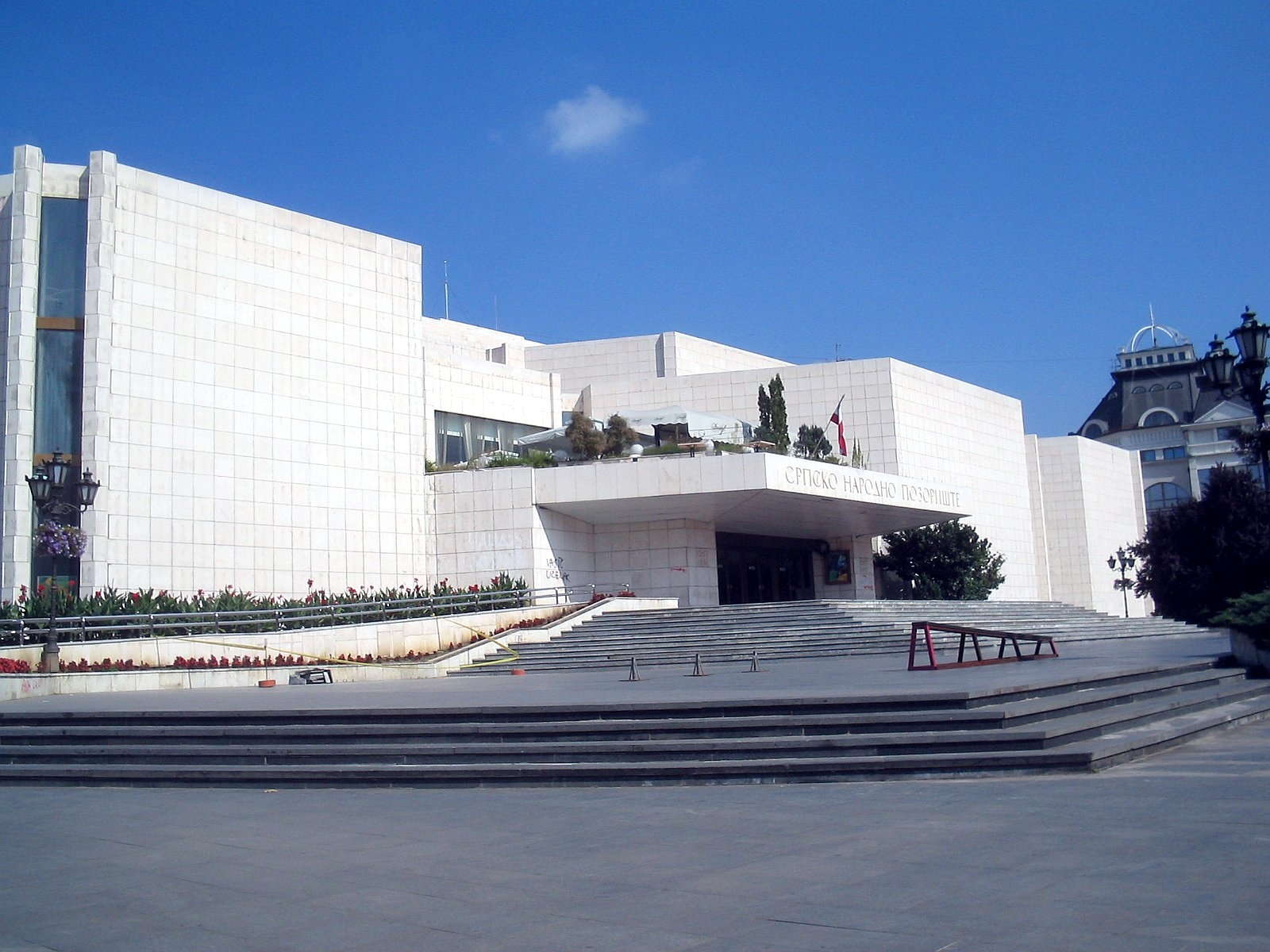
Serbian National Theatre

- Matica Srpska
- Serbian National Theatre
- Novi Sad Theatre
- Novi Sad Youth Theatre
- Cultural Center of Novi Sad
- Eđšeg
- Worker's University

== Gallery and museum buildings ==
- City Museum of Novi Sad
- Museum of Vojvodina
- Museum of Reunion
- Museum of Contemporary Art
- Toy Museum Fantasy
- Pavle Beljanski Memorial Collection
- The Gallery of Fine Arts – Gift Collection of Rajko Mamuzić
- Gallery of Matica Srpska
- Gallery of the association of artists of Vojvodina

== Educational buildings ==
- Jovan Jovanović Zmaj Gymnasium
- Svetozar Marković Gymnasium
- Isidora Sekulić Gymnasium
- Laza Kostić Gymnasium
- Isidor Bajić Secondary School of Music
- University of Novi Sad

== Religious buildings ==
- Bishop's Palace
- Saint George Cathedral
- Name of Mary Church
- Evangelical Lutheran Church of the Augsburg Confession in Kisač
- Novi Sad Synagogue
- Kovilj Monastery

== Sports buildings ==
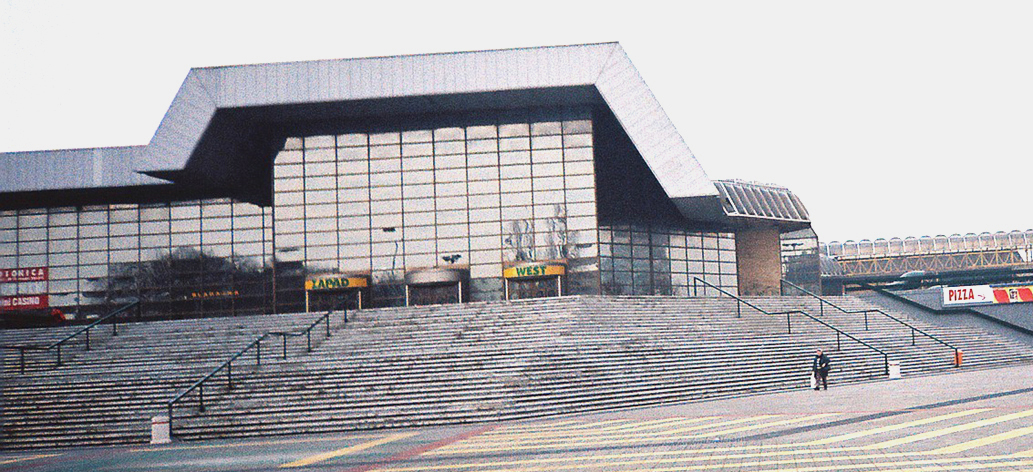
Spens Sports Center

- Karađorđe Stadium
- Spens Sports Center

== Business buildings ==
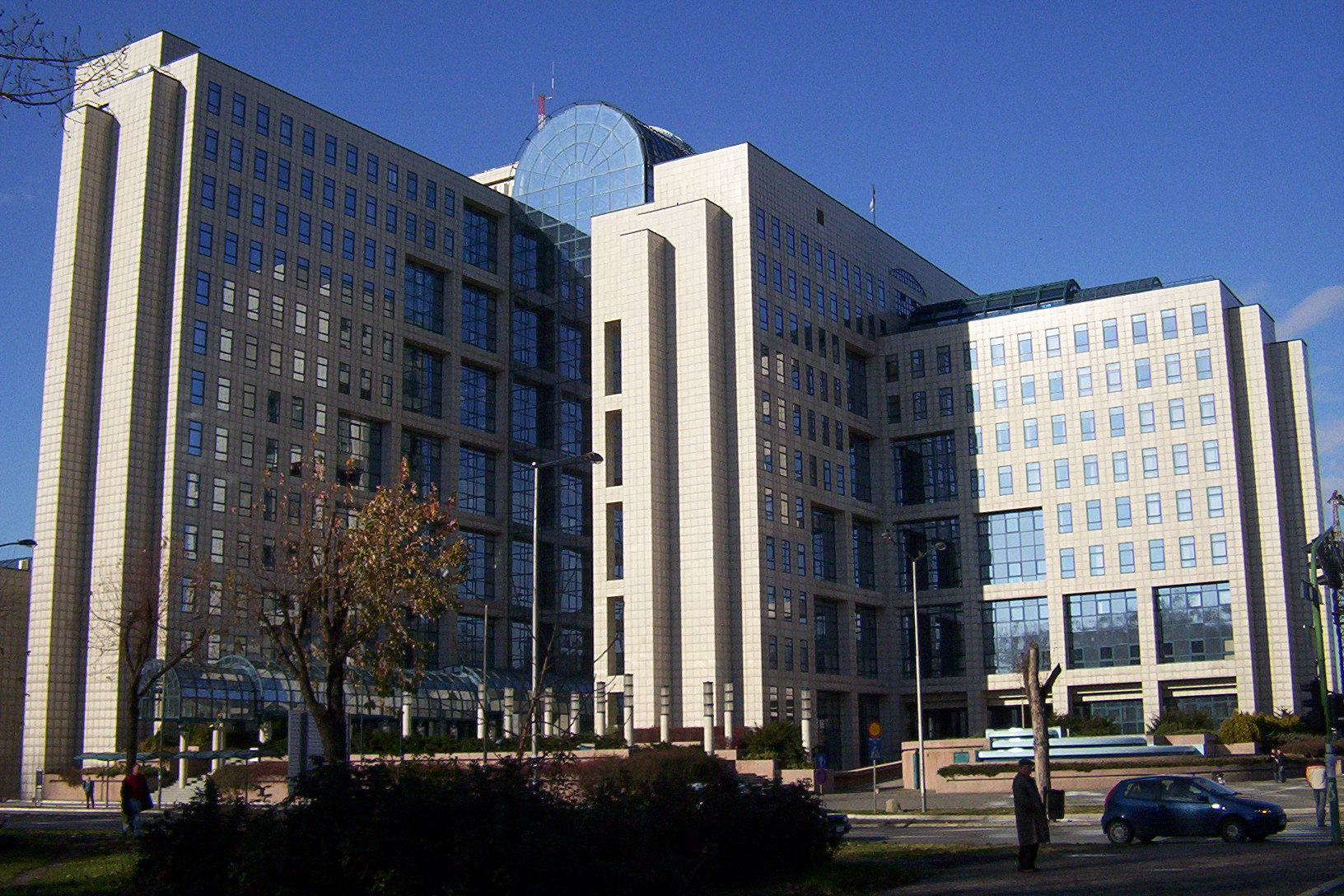
NIS building

- NIS building
- Main Post Office Building
- Novi Sad Fair

== Other buildings ==
- Novi Sad railway station
- Radio Television of Vojvodina

== See also ==
- Religious architecture in Novi Sad
- Transport in Novi Sad
