= Karađorđe Stadium =

Multi-purpose stadium in Novi Sad, Vojvodina, Serbia

- Стадион Карађорђе; Stadion Karađorđe
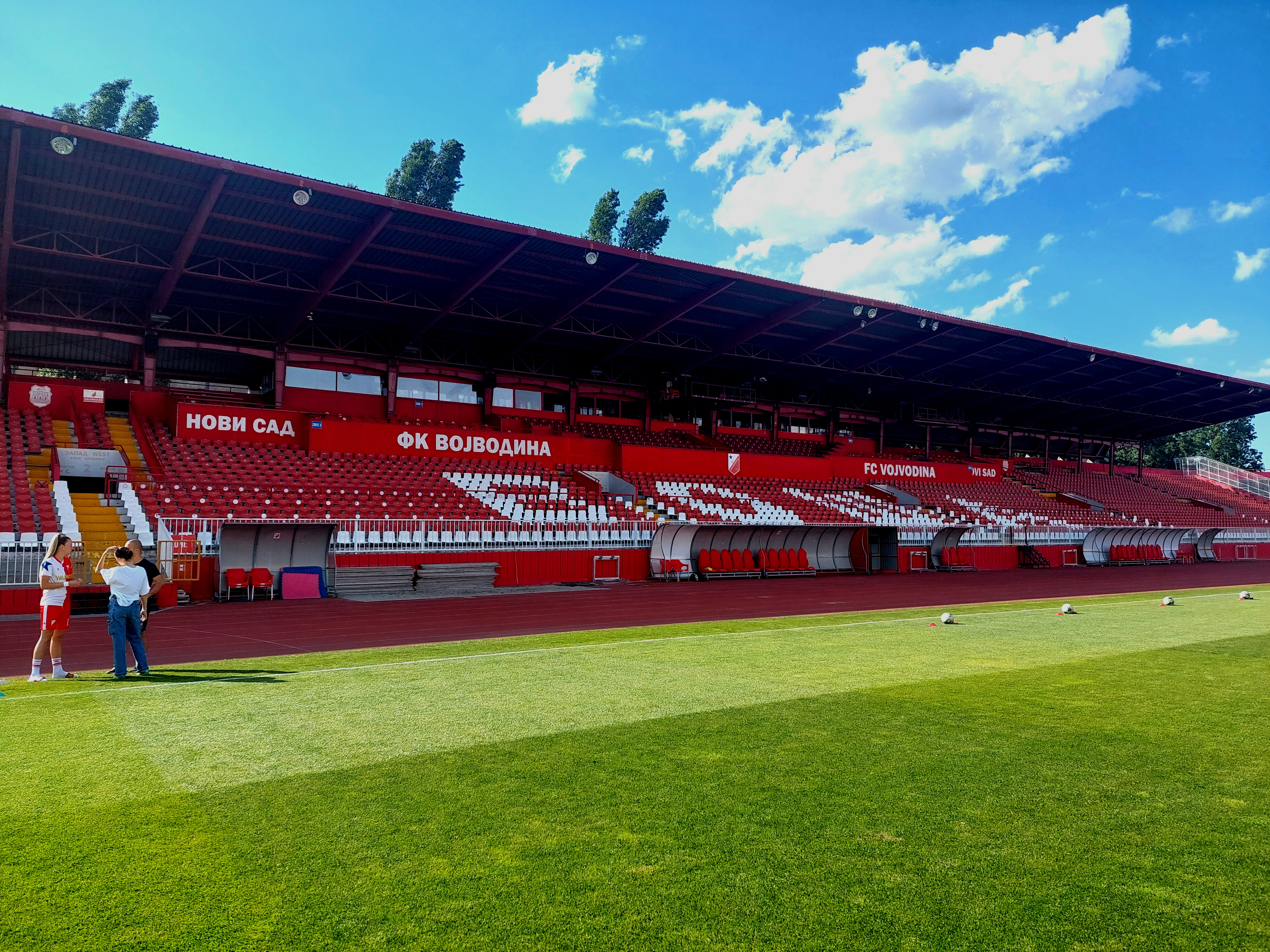
- Interactive map of Karađorđe Stadium
- Full name: Stadion Karađorđe
- Location: Novi Sad, Vojvodina, Serbia
- Coordinates: 45°14′48″N 19°50′32″E
- Owner: FK Vojvodina
- Operator: FK Vojvodina
- Capacity: 14,458
- Executive suites: 150
- Surface: Hybrid grass
- Scoreboard: LED (Philips brand)
- Field size: 105 × 68 m (115 × 75 yd)

Construction
- Opened: 28 June 1924; 102 years ago (on the Serbian holiday Vidovdan)
- Renovated: 1967, 2004, 2009, 2011, 2013
- Expanded: 1931, 1991

Tenants
- Vojvodina (1928–present); Proleter Novi Sad (2018–2022); Mladost Novi Sad (2022–2023); Belarus national football team (2022–2023)

Karađorđe Stadium (Serbian: Стадион Карађорђе, Stadion Karađorđe) is a multi-purpose stadium in Novi Sad, Serbia. It is currently used mostly for football matches and is the home ground of FK Vojvodina. The stadium is one of the most modern stadiums in Serbia and has one of the best pitches in the country. The stadium has a total of 14,853 seats after new renovations were made in 2013. The stadium is also the home ground for the Serbian U-21 football team.

== History ==
In late May 2007, the stadium was the site of Siniša Mihajlović's testimonial match. In 2009, the stadium was given a new athletic track, the southeast stand and a modern Philips scoreboard. After the reconstruction in 2009, it was the venue of the 2009 European Athletics Junior Championships and the 2011 UEFA European Under-17 Championship. In 2011, FK Vojvodina installed floodlights with strength of 1,400 lux. The largest attendance was on 1 March 1967 when Vojvodina played against Scottish side Celtic in the 1966–67 European Cup quarter-final. There were about 30,000 spectators.

Formerly, it was known as the Vojvodina Stadium (Serbian: Стадион Војводине, Stadion Vojvodine) or City Stadium (Serbian: Градски стадион, Gradski stadion). In 2007, the stadium was renamed to Karađorđe Stadium after Karađorđe "Black George", the leader of the First Serbian uprising. However, Karađorđe Stadium was in fact the older and original name of the stadium that was used from its foundation in 1924 until the end of the Second World War.

== Recent upgrades and developments ==
In early 2012, the executive board announced further reconstructions of the Karađorđe stadium. Original plans included the construction of a new south stand, the reconstruction of the eastern and southwest stand. Finally, in May 2013, as a result of UEFA requirements for obtaining a license for UEFA Europa League participation, the city of Novi Sad agreed to an upgrade of the stadium that will take place through June 2013 in time for FK Vojvodina to host Europa League qualifying matches.

== Notable events ==
=== International football matches ===
| Date | | Result | | Competition |
|---|---|---|---|---|
| 21 April 1971 | Yugoslavia | 0–1 | Romania | Friendly |
| 14 November 1979 | Yugoslavia | 5–0 | Cyprus | Euro 80 qualifying |
| 21 November 1981 | Yugoslavia | 5–0 | Luxembourg | 1982 World Cup qualifying |
| 20 September 1989 | Yugoslavia | 3–0 | Greece | Friendly |
| 11 September 2012 | Serbia | 6–1 | Wales | 2014 World Cup qualifying |
| 26 March 2013 | Serbia | 2–0 | Scotland | 2014 World Cup qualifying |
| 11 October 2013 | Serbia | 2–0 | Japan | Friendly |
| 4 September 2015 | Serbia | 2–0 | Armenia | Euro 2016 qualifying |
| 31 May 2016 | Serbia | 3–1 | Israel | Friendly |
| 3 June 2022 | Belarus | 0–1 | Slovakia | 2022–23 Nations League C |
| 6 June 2022 | Belarus | 0–0 | Azerbaijan | 2022–23 Nations League C |
| 10 June 2022 | Belarus | 1–1 | Kazakhstan | 2022–23 Nations League C |
| 25 March 2023 | Belarus | 0–5 | Switzerland | Euro 2024 qualifying |

== Concerts ==
- Eros Ramazzotti - 5 July 2006

== Gallery ==
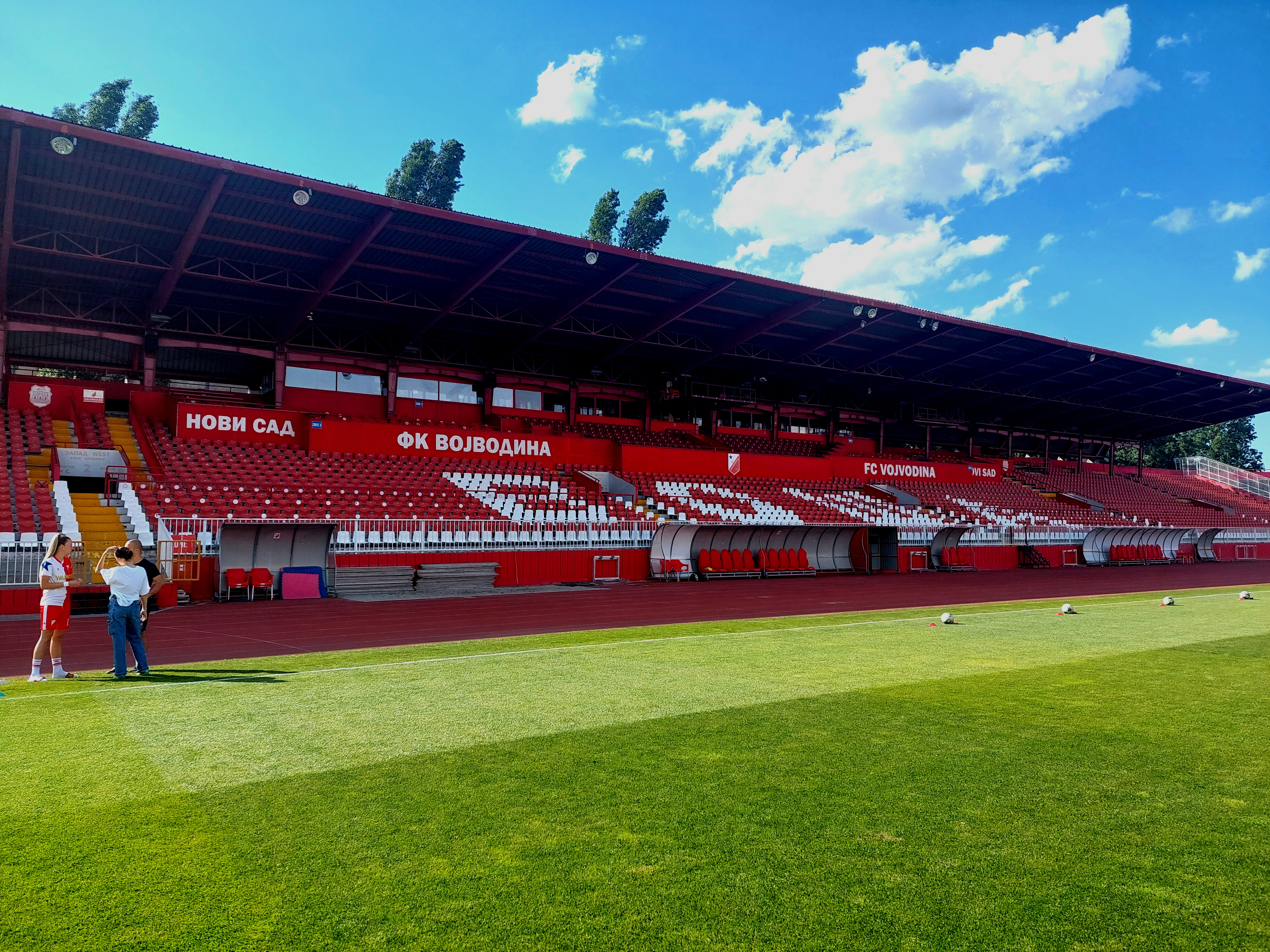
Stadion FK "Karađorđe" u Novom Sadu.

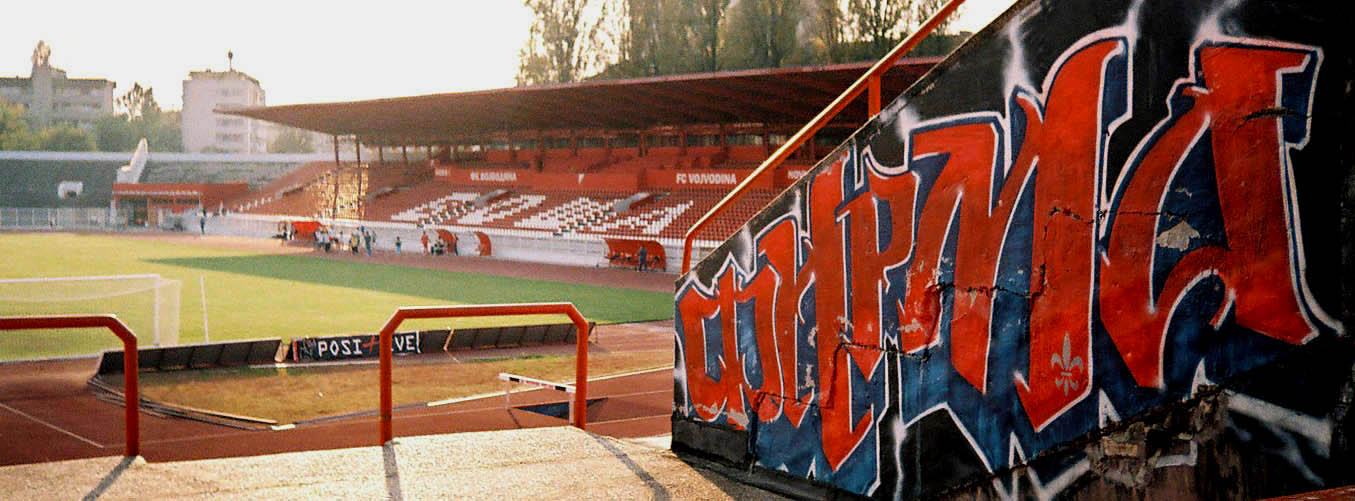
"Firma" graffiti art at Karađorđe Stadium

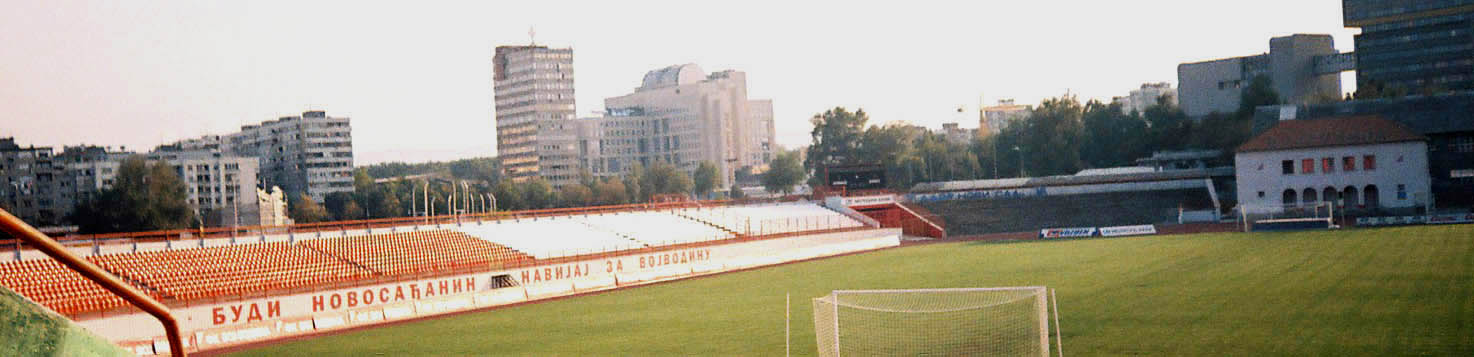
A view of the East stand; To the right is the historic players' locker room house which was knocked down in May 2013 for the stadium upgrade

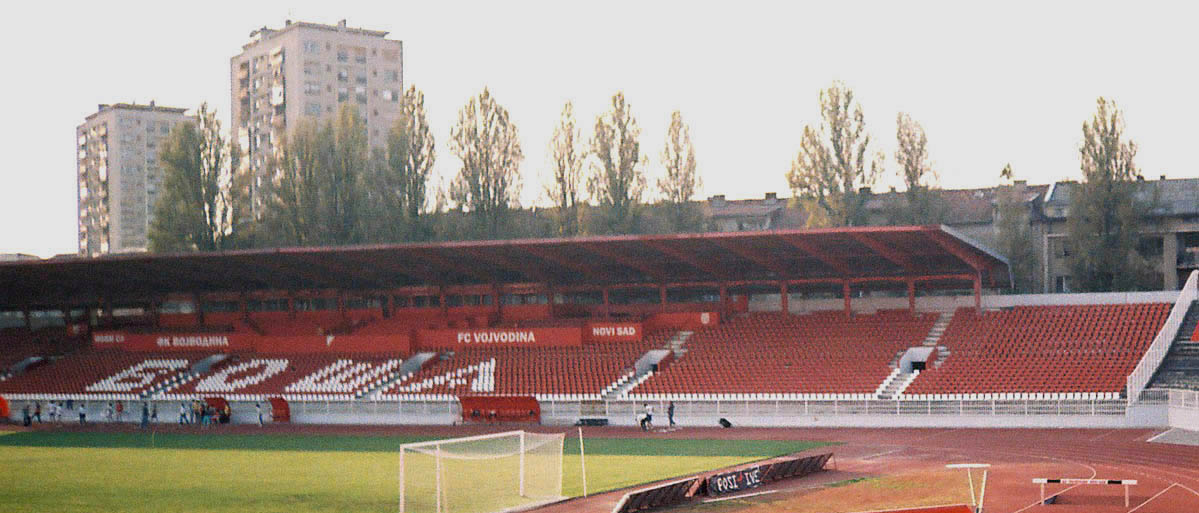
Stadium of Vojvodina (Stadium Karađorđe) in Novi Sad.

== See also ==
- List of football stadiums in Serbia
- Famous buildings in Novi Sad
