= Ines Janković =

Serbian fashion designer

- Occupation: Fashion designer
- Known for: fashion label "Ines Atelier"
- Website: https://www.ines-atelier.com

Ines Janković (Serbian Cyrillic: Инез Јанковић; born 1983) is a Serbian fashion designer based in Belgrade. She is known for her wedding dresses, sportswear separates, leather jackets and jewelry line. Her style has been described as classic but with a twist.

== Background ==
Janković was born in Brčko, Bosnia and Herzegovina, then part of Yugoslavia. Her family moved around when she was young, first relocating to Croatia when she was three years old and then moving back to Bosnia. When the war broke out, her family fled to Novi Sad where Janković attended high school.

Upon graduation from high school, Janković lived in London for year, after which she moved to Italy where she studied interior design in Florence and Rome. She then studied fashion design at the Marangoni Institute in Milan.

== Career ==
Janković launched her clothing line under the label "Ines Atelier" in 2012 and came out with her first jewelry collection in 2013. According to Serbian Elle Magazine, "Her pieces do not deviate too much from the classics, but they always contain some authentic combination, some characteristic but subtle detail."

Janković has presented at Belgrade Fashion Week several times. Her first show in 2012 was called "Birkin Rapsody" and consisted of dresses, trousers, coats and skirts done in vibrant colours. Her 2013 summer collection, called “Gentle Irony”, had day and evening dresses done in turquoise and sand colors, and was inspired by artist Tamara de Lempicka. In 2014, as part of Belgrade Fashion Week's "Zone 45" project, Jankovic participated in runway shows held in Ljublijana and Zagreb. Also seen in Belgrade, the "Glow" collection contained sportswear with futuristic elements and introduced her handmade jewelry line. A later jewelry collection, that came out in 2016, had abstract shapes inspired by the flight of birds and was executed in 3D mesh and leather. The following year, Janković relied on silk cords, Swarovski crystals and semi-precious stones to create her jewelry pieces.

In 2016, her "Modern Bride" wedding collection was described as being minimalist with geometric silhouettes defined by strings and lines. Her 2018 collection of bridal dresses was inspired by architecture and decorated with pearls, petals and lace. In 2017, Janković was included in a special group show at Belgrade Fashion Week that benefited a charity event.

For her clothing line, Janković imports silks and high-tech fabrics mostly from Japan or Italy. Any motifs on the textiles are hand designed by Janković. The leather used in her moto jackets comes from Serbia and is dyed in several colours like blue, green, red or black.

Popular Serbian actress Jelisaveta Orašanin was married in one of Janković's wedding gowns. She also wore one of the designer's outfits at the Cannes Film Festival.

Before working in fashion, Janković was an interior designer.
