= Mihailo Anušić =

Serbian fashion designer

- Born: 1985 (age 40–41)
- Occupation: Fashion designer
- Known for: Founder of "Mihano Momosa" fashion brand (bridal gowns, feathered dresses, and puffy skirts)
- Website: https://www.mihanomomosa.com/

Signature
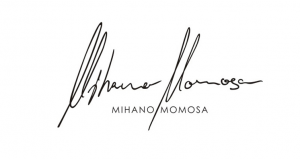

Mihailo Anušić (Serbian Cyrillic: Михаило Анушић; born 1985) is a Serbian fashion designer behind the clothing brand "Mihano Momosa". He is known for designing "romantic looking" bridal gowns, feather dresses and puffy skirts, as well as accessories.

== Education ==
Anušić was born in 1985 in Zrenjanin, where he also attended high school. He then studied at the Faculty of Technical Sciences in Novi Sad.

== Career ==
Anusic began his career as a stylist before founding his label "Mihano Momosa" in 2011. That same year, he had his debut at Belgrade Fashion Week with his first collection "Olivera". Soon after, he opened a studio in Novi Sad and continued to regularly present at Belgrade Fashion Week. His 2013 collection "Rare", seen at the Belgrade show, was described as being a "combination of romanticism, elegance and unrivaled charm.". In 2016, his pieces were viewed as being "light and feminine, with soft hues." He has also presented collections in Zagreb and at Paris Fashion Week.

Anusic's dresses are handmade and often decorated with "lace, feathers, flowers, pearls and other magical details". Relying mostly on pastel colours, he also designs silky blouses and puffy skirts adorned with rose appliques. He cites the emotion love as his main source of inspiration. In 2018, Serbian model Anja Stojković wore one of his bridal dresses at her wedding. In 2017, the editor of Vogue Arabia, Dene Aljuhani Abdulaziz, was seen wearing a "Mihano Momosa" feathered dress.

== Awards ==
At Belgrade Fashion Week 2013, Anusic won the prize for best fashion show from Grazia Magazine Serbia. In 2017, he won for Best Designer at The Elle Style Awards in Belgrade.

== Collections ==
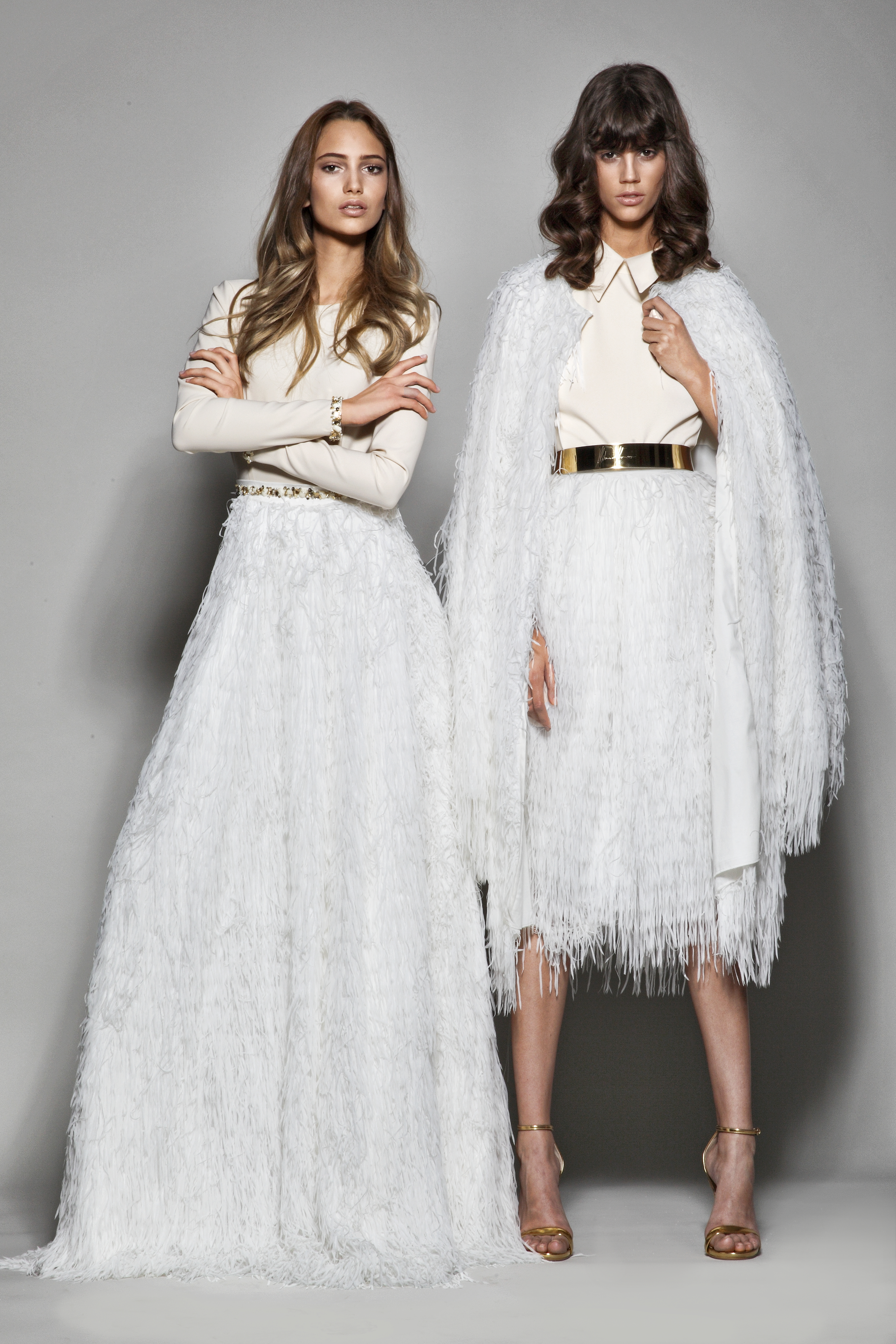
SS 2014 Rare

- Olivera
- SS 2012
- Resort 2012
- Sea 2012
- Spring Summer 2013 - Love
- Fall 2013 - I give you my spring
- Spring Summer 2014 - Rare
- Fall 2014
- Spring Summer 2015
- Prefall 2015
- Spring Summer 2016
- Fall 2015
- Spring Summer 2017
