= Boris Nikolić =

Serbian fashion designer (1974–2008)

- Born: 28 June 1974; Zajecar, Serbia
- Died: 5 April 2008 (aged 33); Belgrade, Serbia
- Occupation: Fashion designer
- Known for: Stripe motifs, contrasting elements

Boris Nikolić (Serbian Cyrillic: Борис Николић; 1974–2008) was a Serbian fashion designer. In his ten-year career, he became a respected and award-winning designer in Serbia. He was known for combining contrasting elements and using striped motifs, as well as for employing unusual titles for his collections.

== Career ==
Nikolić studied at the Academy of Applied Arts in Belgrade. In 1998, Nikolić began working as a fashion designer in Belgrade, Serbia. He and fellow designer Ana Ljubinković opened the shop "Peekaboo" together in 2006. Nikolić also worked as a stylist at the B92 Television network. In 1998, 1999 and 2001, Nikolić was a finalist at the Smirnoff Fashion Awards. He also won the BazArt Prize three times at Belgrade Fashion Week, where he presented his clothing line in 1998, 2000, 2002, 2003 and 2004. His collections often had unexpected names such as "Consequences of Falling" or "Breakfast on the Grass".

== Death and legacy ==
Nikolić died on 5 April 2008 after short illness aged 33. Soon after his death, Belgrade Fashion Week gave him a posthumous award for contributing to the development of fashion as an art. The fashion show also named one of their competition awards after him. Sponsored by B92, the prize includes $2,000 Euros to be used towards the winner's next collection. In 2006, Nikolić was included in a group retrospective at the 40th edition of the festival which is held twice a year. In 2018, to commemorate the ten years since his passing, Belgrade Fashion Week held a special show in his honour where past winners of his namesake award presented their clothing lines.
