= Ana Šekularac =

British-Serbian fashion designer

- Born: 1974 (age 51–52)
- Occupation: Fashion designer
- Known for: Art-deco inspired designs; usage of a red, black and white color scheme
- Website: http://www.anasekularac.com/

Ana Šekularac (Serbian Cyrillic: Ана Шекуларац; born 1974) is a British-Serbian fashion designer based in London. She is known for her tailored pieces, being inspired by Art-Deco silhouettes, and for incorporating a red, black and white color palette.

== Career ==
In 2005, Šekularac launched her namesake label in Belgrade at a fashion show organized by the British Fashion Council. She went on to present shows in Milan and Paris, as well as at London Fashion Week. Her designs have been seen numerous times in fashion magazines like British Vogue, Paris Vogue, Elle Magazine and Italian Vanity Fair. According to British Vogue, her 2009 collection was "...sculptural, elegant and utterly wow", influenced by ballet and choreography. In 2010, Italian Vogue profiled Šekularac, calling her one of the young talented designers of the year. Her 2011 collection, shown at Belgrade Fashion Week, had a red and white color scheme, defined by asymmetrical lines. In 2013, Belgrade Fashion Week awarded her the Bazart prize. In 2014, she participated in a Belgrade show, with other local designers, sponsored by a model scouting agency.

Her designs are worn by celebrities like Keira Knightley, Victoria Beckham, Sienna Miller, and Elle McPherson. In Serbia, Šekularac herself is treated like a celebrity. In 2015, she opened a boutique in downtown Belgrade showcasing her clothing line. However, she feels like she is connected to more than just one place, seeing herself as a global designer.

== Background ==
Šekularac was born in a London suburb in 1974, but lived in Belgrade as a child. Her uncle is a well known Serbian soccer player and coach Dragoslav Šekularac.

Before she became a designer, Šekularac started out as a model after becoming a Ford Supermodel finalist in 1993. She worked in Milan, modeling for brands like Gianfranco Ferré and Miu Miu. In 1999, Šekularac studied "Business Administration and Marketing" at London's South Bank University. She later got her master's degree in "Fashion Styling" at the Instituto Marangoni in Milan. While in Italy, she was an editor's assistant for Cosmopolitan Magazine. She then worked at The Daily Telegraph's fashion desk and also studied "Fashion Illustration and Womenswear Pattern Cutting" at the London College of Fashion.
