= Gorjana Reidel =

American jewelry designer

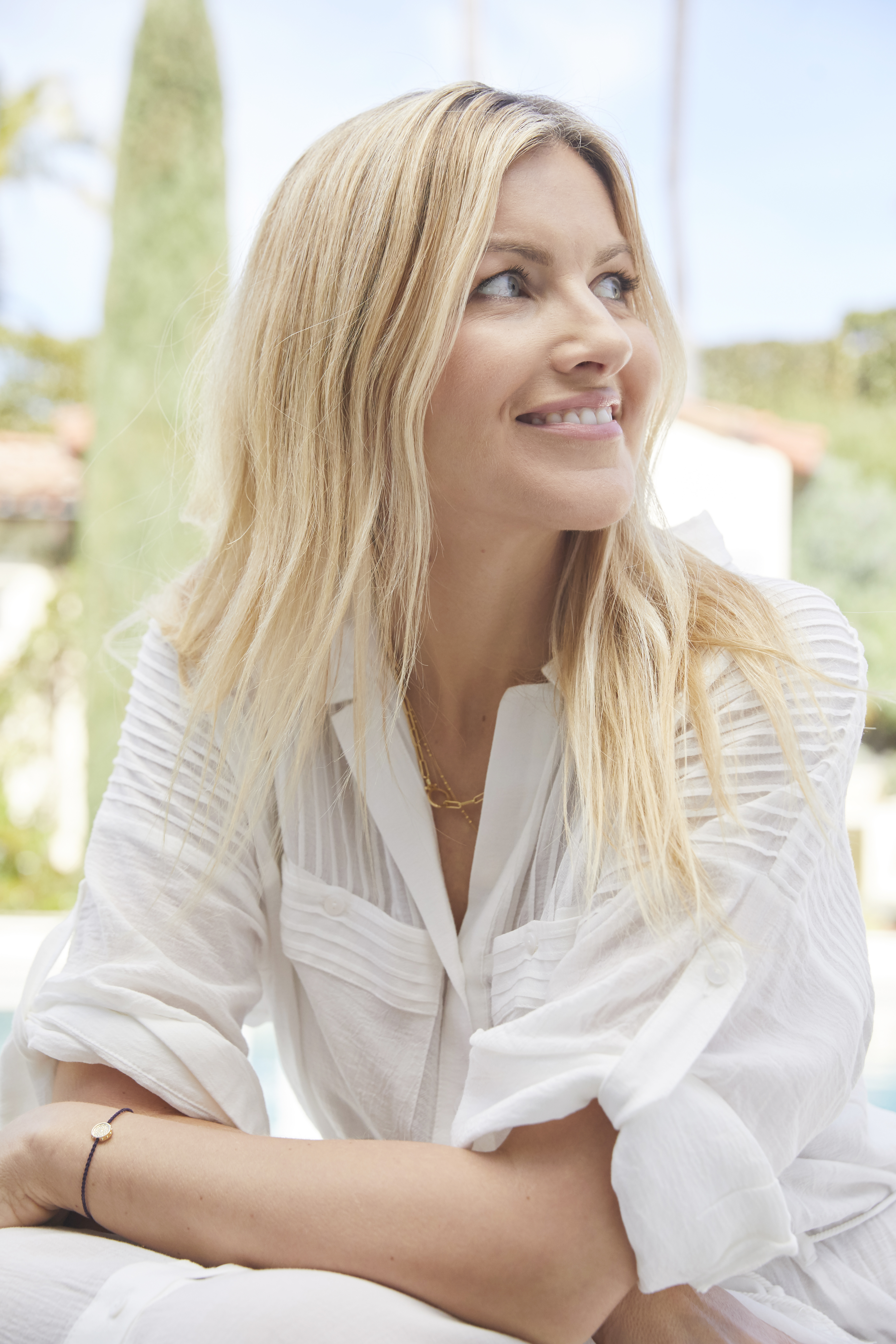
- Born: Serbia
- Occupation: Jewelry Designer
- Spouse: Jason Griffin Reidel
- Children: 2

Gorjana Reidel is an American jewelry designer and entrepreneur based in Laguna Beach, California. She co-founded the jewelry line gorjana in 2004, alongside her husband Jason Griffin Reidel.

== Early years and education ==
Reidel immigrated to the US from Serbia when she was a child. Both she and her husband are former models who each earned a degree in marketing from Arizona State University.

== gorjana (company) ==
Reidel and her husband launched the jewelry brand gorjana in 2004.

In 2016, the Reidels opened their first jewelry brand store in Laguna Beach, followed by a second store in Venice Beach. The 2018 opening of another store in the West Village was their first in New York City. In August 2019 they opened a store in Malibu.

The couple and the company have since opened more than 125 stores on both coasts, with plans for an aggressive retail expansion. Today the multi-million-dollar company has over 100 employees and more than 1,000 retailers worldwide.

== Style ==
Gorjana's design style is for her pieces to mix, match and layer with versatility and adjustability. Her designs have attracted celebrities such as Josephine Skriver, Olivia Wilde and Jessica Alba.

A leader in contemporary jewelry, the gorjana line is found in over 1,000 department and specialty retail stores throughout the U.S.A.

== Private life ==
Reidel and her husband were married in 2001 and have two children.
