= Verica Rakočević =

Serbian clothing designer (born 1948)

Verica Rakočević (Serbian Cyrillic: Верица Ракочевић; born 23 April 1948) is a Serbian clothing designer known for her high fashion lines and for manufacturing uniforms for some of the country's leading companies and organizations. She is considered one of Serbia's top designers and has gained significant influence in various areas of Europe's fashion industry, particularly in magazines and fashion media. In May 2019, Rakočević announced she would step down as creative director of her company to mentor her son Nenad's career and support his comeback to fashion after taking a few years off due to personal family tragedy. Nenad fled the country in 2014 following his arrest and spent 88 days in jail. Rakočević published a book detailing her son's achievements and describing the arrest as a politically motivated attack on him and their family.

== Career ==
Rakočević began her fashion career by opening the Ella boutique in 1983 in Belgrade. In 1997, she launched VR Company, producing perfumes and face creams. She founded her eponymous high fashion label in 1999. She has presented collections at fashion weeks in Rome, Milan, Los Angeles, Moscow, Athens, Vienna, St. Petersburg, Dubai, Cuba, and Belgrade. Her designs have been inspired by themes such as peace, the Ramonda serbica flower, and emotional states. In 2017, actress Monica Bellucci wore one of Rakočević's gowns at a movie premiere in Belgrade. Serbian actress Sloboda Mićalović is also known for wearing the designer's clothing.

Rakočević was editor in chief of the Serbian magazines "L’Officiel" and "Inspire", a publication maintained by the Hyatt Hotel. Today, her VR Company continues to create perfumes, such as Tiburon Azul, and also produces clothing lines for women, men and children. She designs and manufactures many of the uniforms worn at top businesses like Hotel Hyatt Belgrade, the Belgrade Airport, Commercial Bank, and Piraeus Bank.

== Personal life ==
Rakočević was first married to Boran Karaman and they have a daughter Elena Karaman Karić, who is an interior designer. Her second husband was Zoran Rakočević and they have a son Milorad and daughter Milena. Milena Rakocević is a photographer living in New York City. The designer's son and first daughter both live in Belgrade. Her third husband is composer Veljko Kuzmancević. They have been married since 2003. Rakočević is a supporter of LGBT rights and has marched in the Belgrade Pride Parade.
