= Zvonko Marković =

Serbian fashion designer

- Occupation: Fashion designer
- Known for: Sculptural and luxurious dresses; leather and silk materials
- Website: www.zvonkomarkovic.com

Zvonko Marković (born 11 April 1975) is a Serbian fashion designer known for creating sculptural leather clothing, as well as opulent gowns made of lace and silk. In 2018, he celebrated twenty years in the fashion industry with a special collection seen at "Serbia Fashion Week".

== Biography ==
Marković was born in Podgorica and moved to Belgrade when he was ten years old. Graduating in 2001, he studied at the Faculty of Applied Arts and Design in Belgrade, Serbia. He started out as a commercial clothing designer and also created costumes for theater companies. He presented his first collection in 1998 in Serbia. His clothing gained attention in 2002, after designing a concert gown for pop folk singer Svetlana Ceca Ražnatović.

Marković has presented his clothing line in Paris, New York, Los Angeles, Rome, St. Petersburg, and Shanghai, as well as in his native country at Serbia Fashion Week. In 2015 and 2016, he participated in the "Paris Haute Couture" fashion show in France. Called "Night Moth", the 2015 collection had pieces designed with silk georgette, anaconda skins, and jersey. The 2016 collection was named "Land of Lilacs" and featured leather combined with floral prints and feathers. In 2017 and 2018, he also put on runway shows at "New York Fashion Week".

Marković celebrated two decades of career at "Serbia Fashion Week" in April 2018 with a collection inspired by fairy tales. Several months later, he presented a collection in Shanghai, China which led to other runway shows in Asia.

His clothes have been worn by local celebrities such as Lepa Brena, Ana Nikolić, and Jelena Janković, as well as international ones like singer Ashanti and model Kylie Jenner. Marković believes that "fashion in every possible way deals with art" and that "clothes are kind of three-dimensional sculpture, and in movement, they get a new, fourth dimension."

== Awards ==
In 2003, Marković won a ULUPUDS prize for best leather collection at the Belgrade Fair. He has also received two awards from Serbia Fashion Week. In 2017, he was awarded a prize from the Paris organization "Centre du luxe et de la création".
