= European Fashion Council =

- Banner logo of the European Fashion Council
- Abbreviation: EFC
- Formation: May 19, 2007; 19 years ago
- Type: NGO
- Headquarters: Plovdiv, Bulgaria
- Members: Albania Armenia; Austria; Belgium; Bosnia and Herzegovina; Bulgaria; Czech Republic; Denmark; Estonia; Hungary; Iceland; Latvia; Malta; Netherlands; Norway; Romania; Serbia; Sweden; Ukraine Spain
- Vice President: Gariella Walek
- Vice President: Anne Mandrup
- Vice President: Sonja Noel
- EFC Ethical Commission President: Emilia Visileanu
- Key people: Nadya Valeva, President
- Website: www.europeanfashioncouncil.eu

The European Fashion Council is a non-governmental organization authorized to represent the European Union in fashion and fashion design worldwide. It is a union of 20 countries that are primarily located in Europe.

== History ==
The organization was founded on May 19, 2007 in House-Museum "Hindliyan", Old Town of Plovdiv, Bulgaria by the following 11 European countries:

- Austria
- Belgium
- Bulgaria
- Denmark
- Estonia
- Hungary
- Romania
- Albania
- Bosnia and Herzegovina
- Norway
- Ukraine

EFC was officially registered on 6 August 2007 in the District Court of Plovdiv, Bulgaria, which was the very first step towards the conjunction of the different national fashion industries in Europe. Its first significant recognition was in January, 2010, when the organization was officially registered in the Transparency Register of the European Union by the European Commission as an NGO/think-thank for fashion. It was the following year, 2011, when the European Fashion Council officially became an institutionalized organization of the EU for the adoption of its official logo depicting three circular constellations of yellow stars on a blue background. In the month of May, 2012, the European Fashion Council officially became one of the 16 eligible organizations with an approved status to implement the UNESCO Convention on the Protection and Promotion of the Diversity of Cultural Expressions. As of March, 2014, the European Fashion Council has 20 member states, represented by national Non-Governmental Organizations of the fashion industries in Europe, as well as 14,100 members that are companies, organizations and people - fashion designers, photographers, stylists, makeup artists, fashion design teachers and others related to the fashion industry of Europe.

== Mission ==
The European Fashion Council strives for:

- Integration, tolerance and cooperation between the different European fashion industries;
- Popularization, support and establishment of the fashion art on a pan-European level;
- Support of the development of the fashion design in Europe;
- Development of the cooperation between the business circles of the represented member states;
- Exchange and realization of ideas, events, initiatives and concepts by the member states.

To achieve its goals, the EFC:

1. Examines its legal acts and the current economic situation of the fashion industries in Europe and their trends;
2. Helps for the establishment of a climate, appropriate for cooperation between the companies and organizations in the represented countries;
3. Assists in the lobbying of the members before their official institutions for the stimulation of the fashion design and the activities related to it - production, commerce, services and finances;
4. Helps in facilitating the business visits of designers, models, photographers and all other persons taking part in the fashion events, to any European country, as well as between the represented countries, for the purposes of the development of the European economic cooperation;
5. Presents concepts for structural changes in the economic fields of its member states in accordance with the criteria and the standards of the European Union;
6. Assists the member states in solving their possible arguments and issues by means of negotiations;
7. Exchanges experience in the field of intellectual property rights with other European organizations and offers protection on the copyright of the designers and fashion houses who work in Europe;
8. Supports the education in the various areas of the European fashion industry through the establishment of schools and academies.
9. Represents new fashion labels, products and services;
10. Works for the establishment of the fashion design as a cultural factor;
11. Builds up a network of complex designers centers in each member state.

== Structure ==
=== Organisational structure ===
The EFC's legislative structure has an hierarchical form. Currently the president of the organization is the National Fashion Chamber of Republic of Bulgaria whose chairperson is Ms. Nadya Valeva - founder of both the European Fashion Council and the National Fashion Chamber of Bulgaria. The European Fashion Council also has three vice presidents:

- Mrs. Sonja Noel - Modo Bruxellae, Belgium;
- Mrs. Anne Marie Mondrup - President of Fashion Tomorrow Management, Denmark;
- Mrs. Gabriella Walek - President of the National Fashion League Hungary, Hungary.

In 2010, the European Fashion Council established an ethical commission, whose main duty is to be a mediator between members and institutions, authors and consumers of fashion and fashion design in Europe as well as the body, that is deputed to resolve conflicts and to determine whether to impose sanctions on the basis of the Regulations of the European ethical fashion code. The president of this official authority of the EFC is the National Research-Development Institute for Textile and Leather, Romania.

=== Membership ===
As of March, 2014, the European Fashion Council comprises 20 member states. The persons who are engaged in the activities of the European Fashion Council and fall under the scope of transparency, are active on a voluntary basis.

Country	Accession	Representative organization	President/Chairperson	Type of membership
Albania	2007	Albanian Fashion Designers Association	Diana Sokolaj	Founder and associated member
Armenia	2010	Armenian Fashion Council	Armine Tadveosyan	Associated member
(European Union) Austria	2007	European Fashion Council Austria	Darko Peric	full-right member
(European Union) Belgium	2007	Modo Bruxellae	Sonja Noel	Founder and full-right member
Bosnia and Herzegovina	2007	Sarajevo Fashion Week	Amela Radan	Founder and associated member
(European Union) Bulgaria	2007	National Fashion Chamber of Bulgaria	Nadya Valeva	Founder and full-right member
(European Union) Czech Republic	2010	National Fashion Chamber of Czech Republic	Julia Hendrychova	Full-right member
(European Union) Denmark	2007	Tomorrow Management	Anne Marie Mondrup	Founder and full-right member
(European Union) Estonia	2007	Estonian Fashion Council	Anu Kikas	Founder and full-right member
(European Union) Hungary	2007	National Fashion League Hungary	Gabriella Walek	Founder and full-right member
Iceland	2008	Iceland Fashion Week	Kolla Adalsteinsdottir	Associated member
(European Union) Latvia	2010	Baltic Fashion Federation	Elena Strahova	Full-right member
(European Union) Malta	2010	Malta Fashion Week and Awards	Andrian Mizzi	Full-right member
(European Union) The Netherlands	2008	Europa Regina	Frank Verspoor	Member for promotion of design
Norway	2007	Oslo Fashion Week	Pal Vasbotten	Founder and associated member
(European Union) Portugal	2014	ModaLisboa Association	Eduarda Abbondanza	Full-right member
(European Union) Romania	2007	National Research & Development Institute for Textile and Leather	Emilia Visileanu	Founder and full-right member
Serbia	2012	National Fashion Chamber of Serbia	Svetlana Horvat	Associated member
(European Union) Sweden	2011	Noble Trust & Noble Fashion Awards Association	Mats Peetersson	Full-right member
Ukraine	2007	Ukrainian Fashion Council	Iryna Danylevska	Founder and associated member
(European Union) Germany	2023	European Fashion Council Germany	Alexander Britt	Full-right-member
Spain	2019	Spanish Fashion Council	Julio César Battaglia	Associated member since 2019

== See also ==
- European Union
- European Commission
