= Bata Spasojević =

Serbian fashion designer

- Born: Slobodan Spasojević; March 12, 1971 (age 54); Belgrade, Serbia
- Other names: Bata Spasojević
- Occupation: Fashion designer
- Years active: 1999 – present

Bata Spasojević (Belgrade, 12 March 1971) is a Serbian fashion designer. He designs both men's and women's clothing.

== Background ==
Slobodan "Bata" Spasojević was born in Belgrade, on 12 March 1971. After he finished secondary technical school, he studied costume design at the Belgrade's Faculty of Applied Arts under the mentorship of professor Ljiljana Žegarac - Delja. He graduated in 1999, and in the same year he presented his first collection "New Spice" at the Serbia Fashion Week. After the graduation he started to work for "Centrotextil" AD, under the brand of "Cinemoda." His work has been displayed at the Master Centre in Novi Sad. He is a recipient of the best male collection at the Serbia Fashion Award.

In 2011, his Matrix-like futuristic garments (trench coats and pants with an excess of zippers) were on display at the Miami Beach International Fashion Week. According to Sun-Sentinel reporter Joanie Cox, the garments were a little bit too futuristic for the men of today. He opened the 34th Belgrade Fashion Week in late March 2014.

In February 2016, his work was displayed at the DC Fashion Week, held in Washington DC.

In September 2016, "Elucid Magazine" showed his collection "Body and Soul" at the "World Fashion Parade" on Broadway.
