= Ana Rajčević =

Serbian artist

Ana Rajcevic
- Born: Belgrade, SR Serbia, SFR Yugoslavia
- Citizenship: Serbian and German
- Occupations: Designer, artist, research scientist
- Known for: Embodied design, animal-inspired bionics, and body extensions
- Website: http://anarajcevic.com

Ana Rajčević (Serbian Cyrillic: Ана Рајчевић) is a Serbian designer, artist, and research scientist known for her work on new forms of embodiment that integrate human, animal, and technological systems, based in Boston and Berlin. Her interdisciplinary practice brings together embodied design, bionics, biology, neuroscience, robotics, and art, translating principles of animal morphology, sensing, and behavior into new forms of movement, perception, agency, and inhabitation. She terms this approach chimeric embodiment.

Rajčević holds a PhD from the University of Applied Arts in Vienna, and is also a visiting lecturer at UAL-University of the Arts, London. In 2024, Rajčević joined the MIT Media Lab as a Research Scientist, and in 2025 was appointed Distinguished Visiting Artist at the MIT Center for Art, Science & Technology (MIT CAST). At MIT, she leads Hybrid Embodiments research within Hugh Herr’s Biomechatronics Group, developing neurally controlled and sensorily integrated non-anthropomorphic prosthetic systems informed by animal morphology and movement. The Independent voted her one of the most promising artists from the University of the Arts in London in 2012.

Rajčević studied architecture and design in Belgrade before completing an MA in design at the University of the Arts London, where her graduate project Animal: The Other Side of Evolution received the university-wide Design Award in 2012.. The same year, The Animal received the main design award at International Talent Support, an international competition for emerging designers held in Trieste, Italy. Other awards include SEED Organization Award for Exceptional Talents by University of the Arts, London, UK, and Worth Project Grant by the European Commission's Directorate-General for Enterprise and Industry in Belgium. In 2014, Rajčević was a finalist for Artist of the Year and Designer of the Year at the 3D Printshow Global Awards, and in 2015 was nominated for the Outstanding Creation & Invention Prize at the International Design Biennale Saint-Étienne in France, where she presented her work in 2014.

Rajčević works across scientific research, experimental design, installation, and performance, developing work at scales ranging from body extensions and robotic and biohybrid systems to interactive and architectural environments. Her work employs robotics, biomaterials and living tissue, sensing and actuation systems, neural interfaces, morphological and material design, computational modeling, and methods of digital and physical fabrication.

Rajčević’s work has been exhibited internationally at institutions including the Cooper Hewitt, Smithsonian Design Museum in New York,.Museum Boijmans Van Beuningen in Rotterdam (NL), Design Museum Den Bosch, and an the San Jose Museum of Art, as well as at the Venice Design Biennale. Her work is held in the permanent collection of Design Museum Den Bosch and has been featured in publications including The Independent, The Guardian, Wired, CNN, and Dazed, Vogue and Forbes. Rajčević has also worked extensively in performance and interdisciplinary collaborations, with projects presented at venues including Sadler's Wells (UK), Haus der Kulturen der Welt (DE), Volksbühne Berlin (DE), and the Echigo-Tsumari Art Triennal. In 2015 she has been elected a member of the Royal Society of Arts.
