= Eđšeg =

Building in Novi Sad, Serbia

Eđšeg Castle
- Дворац Еђшег; Dvorac Eđšeg; Kastély Egység
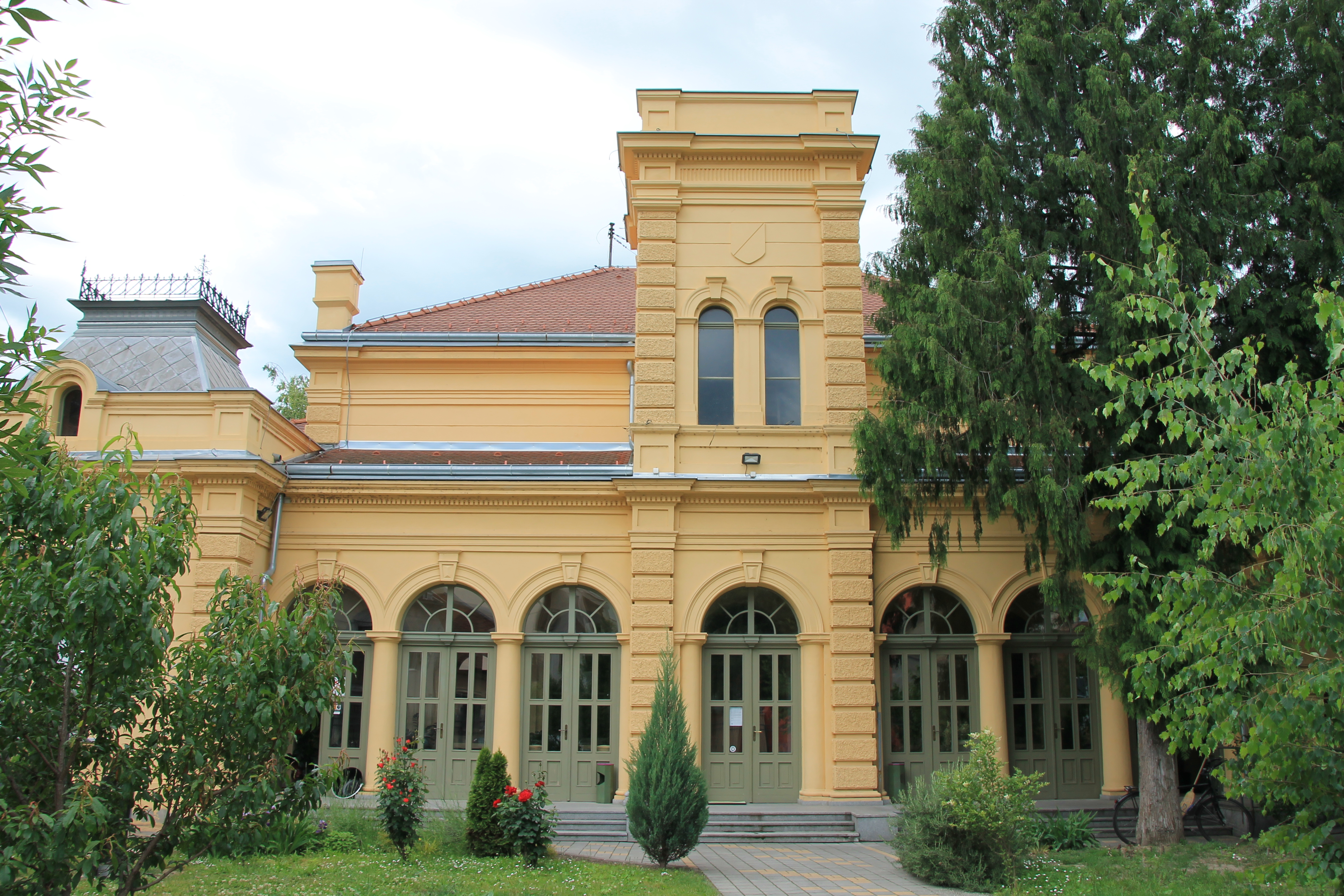
- Front view of Edšeg
- Alternative names: Дворац Јединство; Dvorac Jedinstvo

General information
- Status: Completed
- Architectural style: Eclecticism
- Location: Antona Čehova 4, Novi Sad, Serbia
- Coordinates: 45°14′53.5″N 19°49′48.5″E
- Current tenants: Kulturna Stanica Eđšeg
- Construction started: 1889
- Completed: 1890
- Opened: 1890; 136 years ago
- Inaugurated: 1890 (original); 2014 (after renovation)
- Renovated: 2012

Design and construction
- Architect: Molnár György
- Engineer: Karl Lehrer

Website
- edjseg.kulturnestanice.rs

Eđšeg (Serbian: Еђшег, Eđšeg, Hungarian: Egység) is a cultural centre and community event space located in Novi Sad, Vojvodina, Serbia. Originally operating as the luxurious lodge of a shooting club, it was designed by architect Molnár György and built by Karl Lehrer in 1890.

== Name ==
The name Eđšeg comes from the Hungarian word Egység, meaning "Unity" in English or "Jedinstvo" (Јединство) in Serbian, which was also the name of a sports society that had function in the chateau after World War II.

== History ==
Edšeg was built at what was once the outskirts of Novi Sad, on the Futoški put, in today's Antona Čehova street. It was raised by the shooting club ("Societas Jaculatoria" or "Građansko streljačko društvo") from Novi Sad. Designed and built in 1890 on the centenary of the shooting society's founding, it was designed by the famous architect György Molnár in then popular eclectic style, while Karl Lehrer built it.

After World War II, the original owner of the shooting club was convicted by the communist government of Yugoslavia for alleged collaboration with the Hungarian occupiers and all his possessions were confiscated and nationalized on 6 December 1945. The building was then given by the government to be used by the shooting club "Jedinstvo" (Јединство) for which the chateau was named after. Afterwards it was used by many others groups, but it lost its use at the end of the 20th century.

For a long while, the chateau was left in disrepair, with many homeless people and drug addicts.

In 2007, the building was saved from demolition by declaring it a cultural monuments of great importance and put under the protection of the State of Serbia.

While the roof was preventatively reconstructed in 2000, so as to not collapse and to keep the interior from being affected by the weather, the full reconstruction took place between September 2010 and June 2012, with funds given by the City of Novi Sad. The construction works were supervised by the Institute for the Protection of Cultural Monuments, and the amount of money invested in its reconstruction was 55 million Serbian dinars. It was inaugurated on 15 September 2014.

On 8 September 2018, Chateau Edšeg has become a cultural center (Kulturna Stanica Eđšeg), and is now the ideal venue for cultural and artistic events, concerts, competitions, theatre performances, recitals, etc. It was one of the important pillars for conducting cultural events in 2022, when Novi Sad became the European Capital of Culture.

== Characteristics ==
Designed in the eclectic style, it consists of three side halls and one large ballroom. The interior of the main hall is richly decorated and the ceiling is painted with hunting and village life scenes, with stylized floral and geometric motifs. Pilasters have Corinthian captains, and the interior is brightly lit. The chateau has a central entry tower, and on each side a symmetrical facade with three windowed archways. The hallway is brightly lit, with light ochre, white, and gold colors.

After the reconstructions, the chateau received modern electrical installations, floor heating (powered by modern geothermal energy accumulators located in the courtyard), built in air condition, decorative and functional lighting, as well as emergency installations in case of a fire or theft.

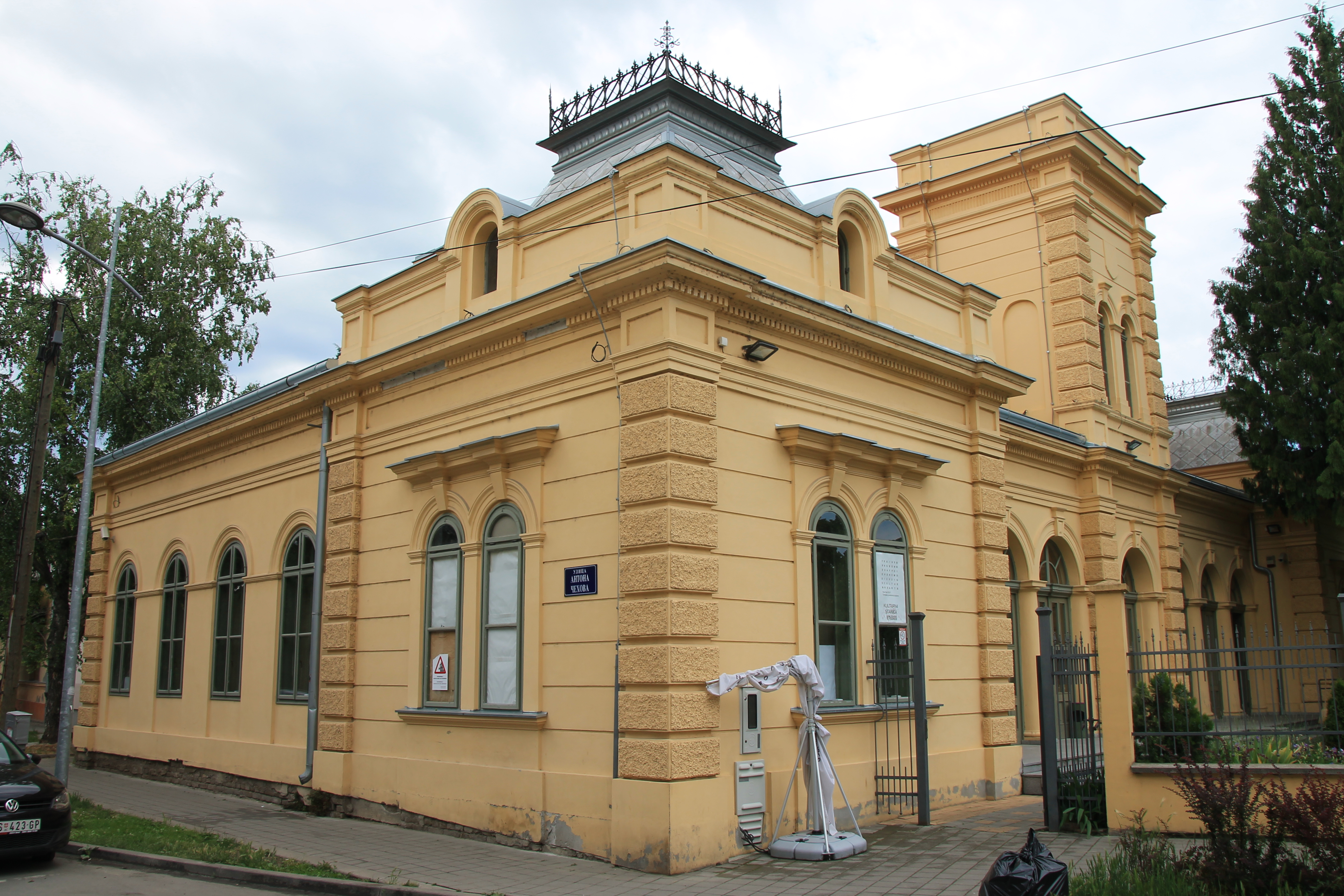
Side view of Chateau Eđšeg

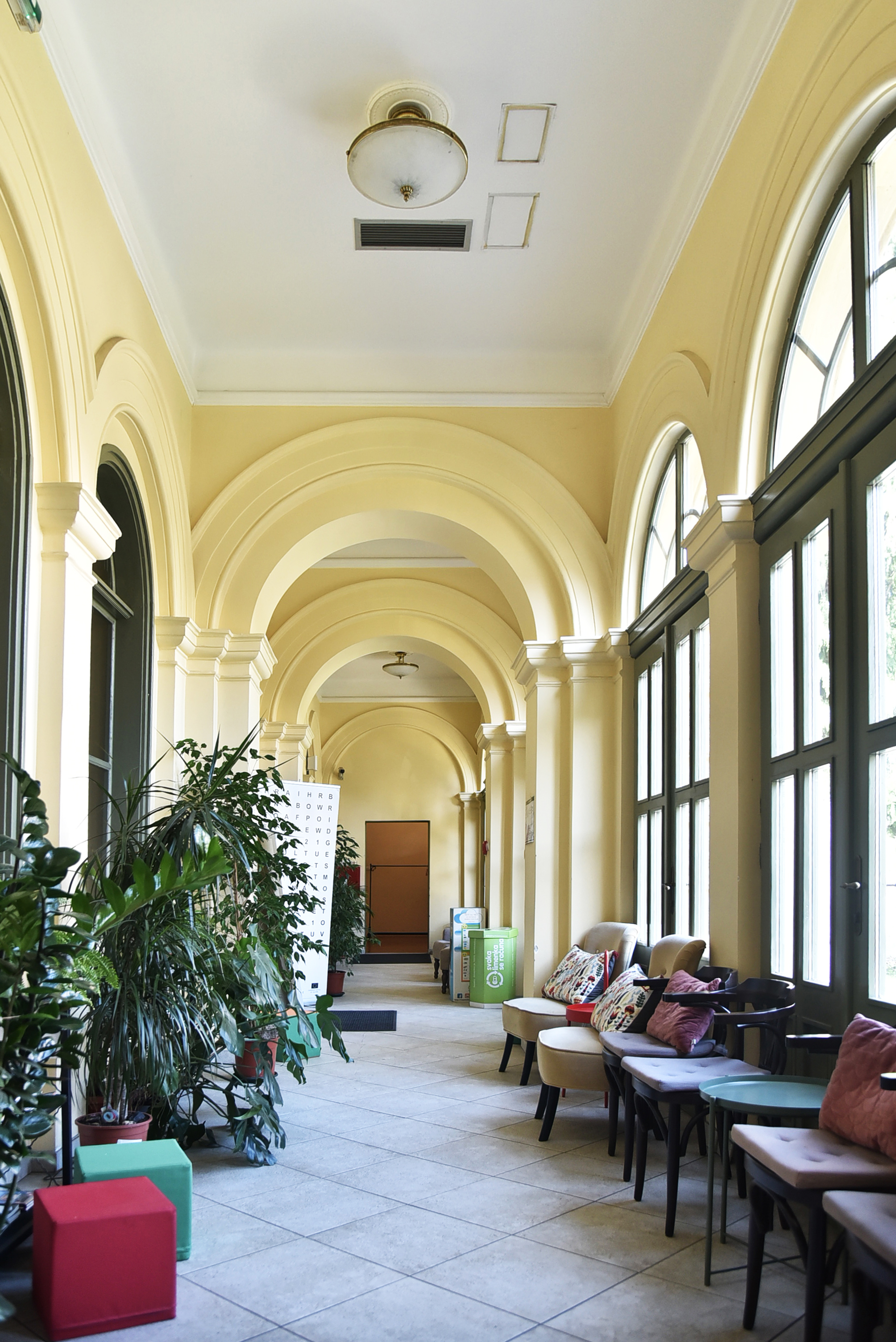
Right view of the hallway

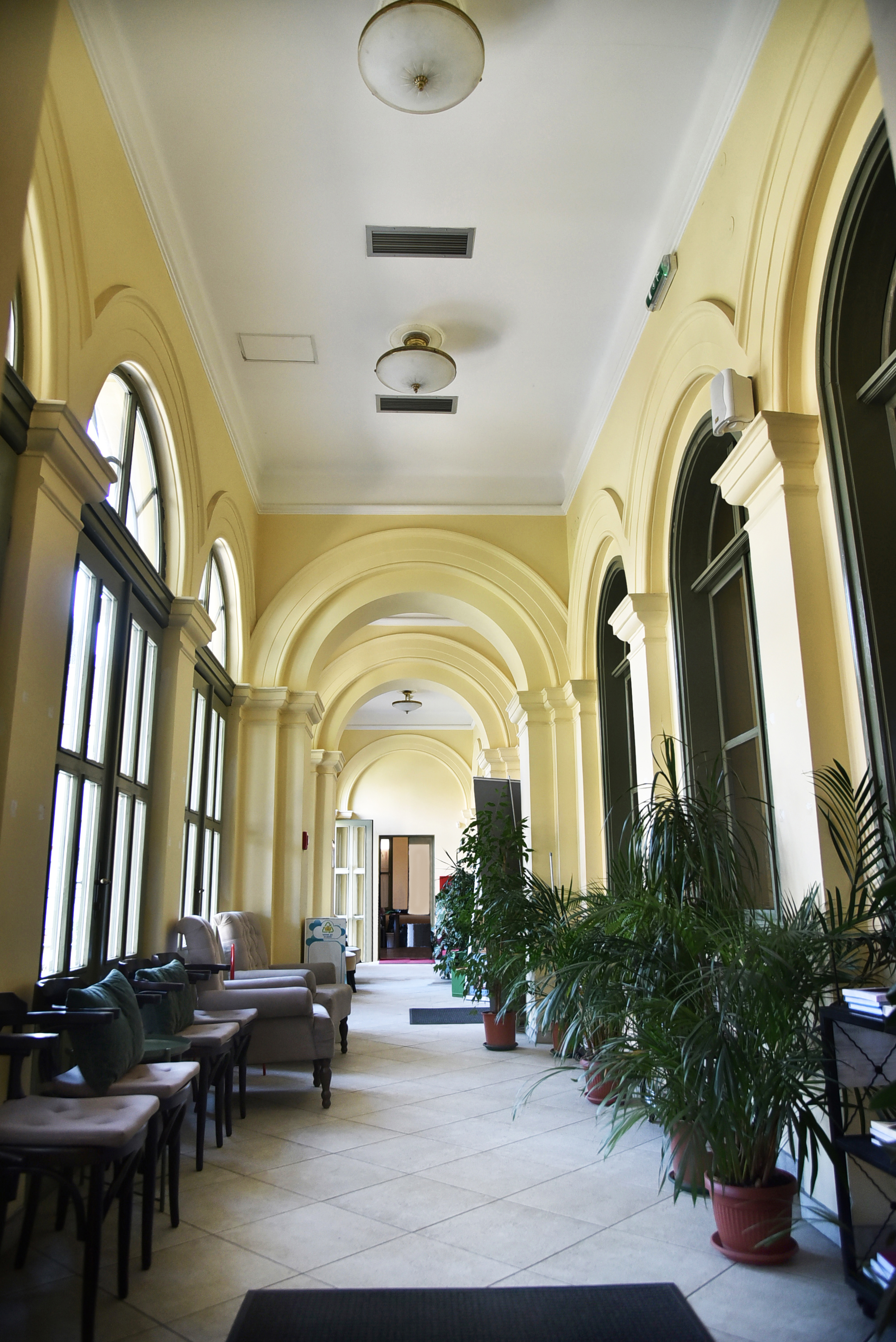
Left view of the hallway

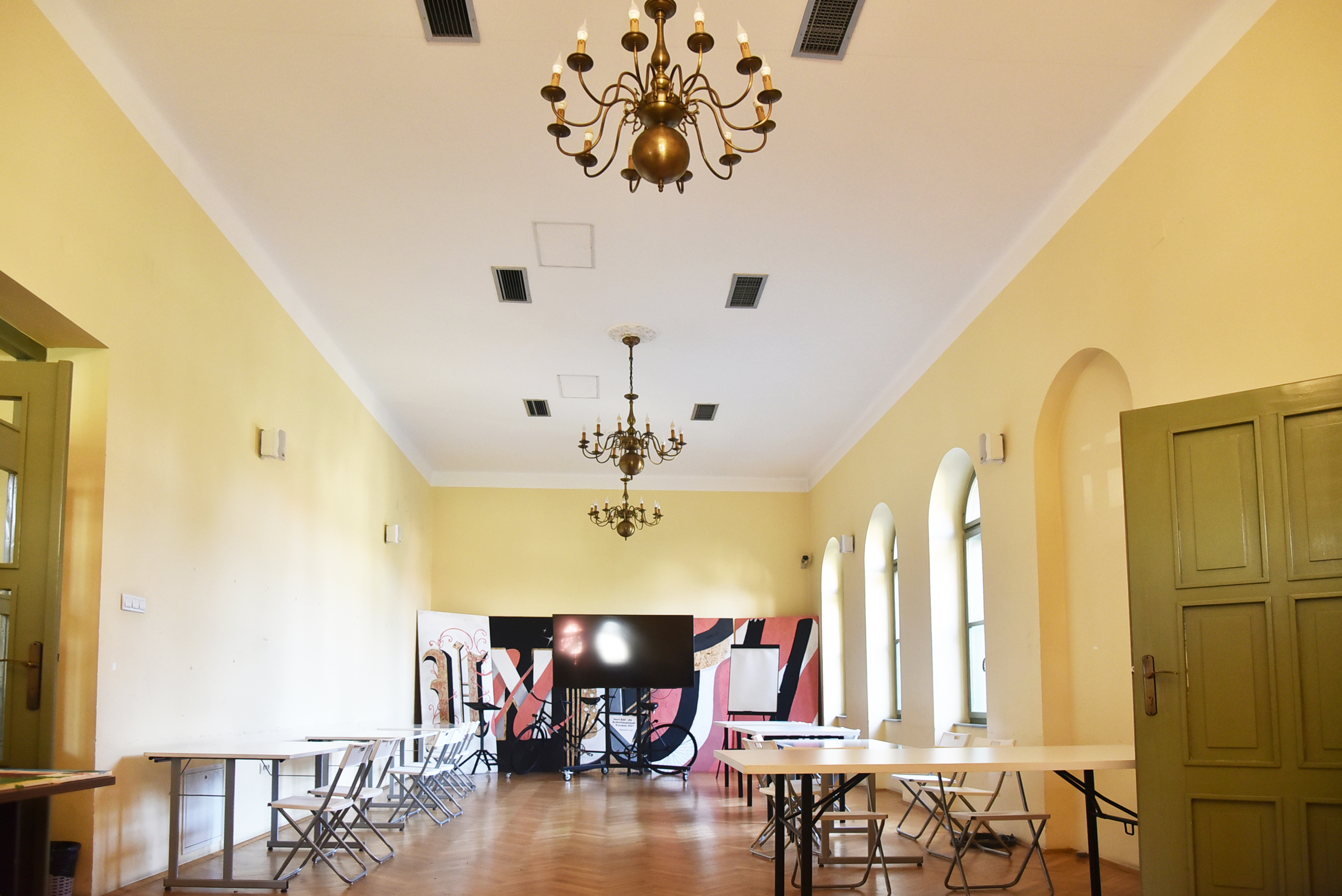
One of the three side halls

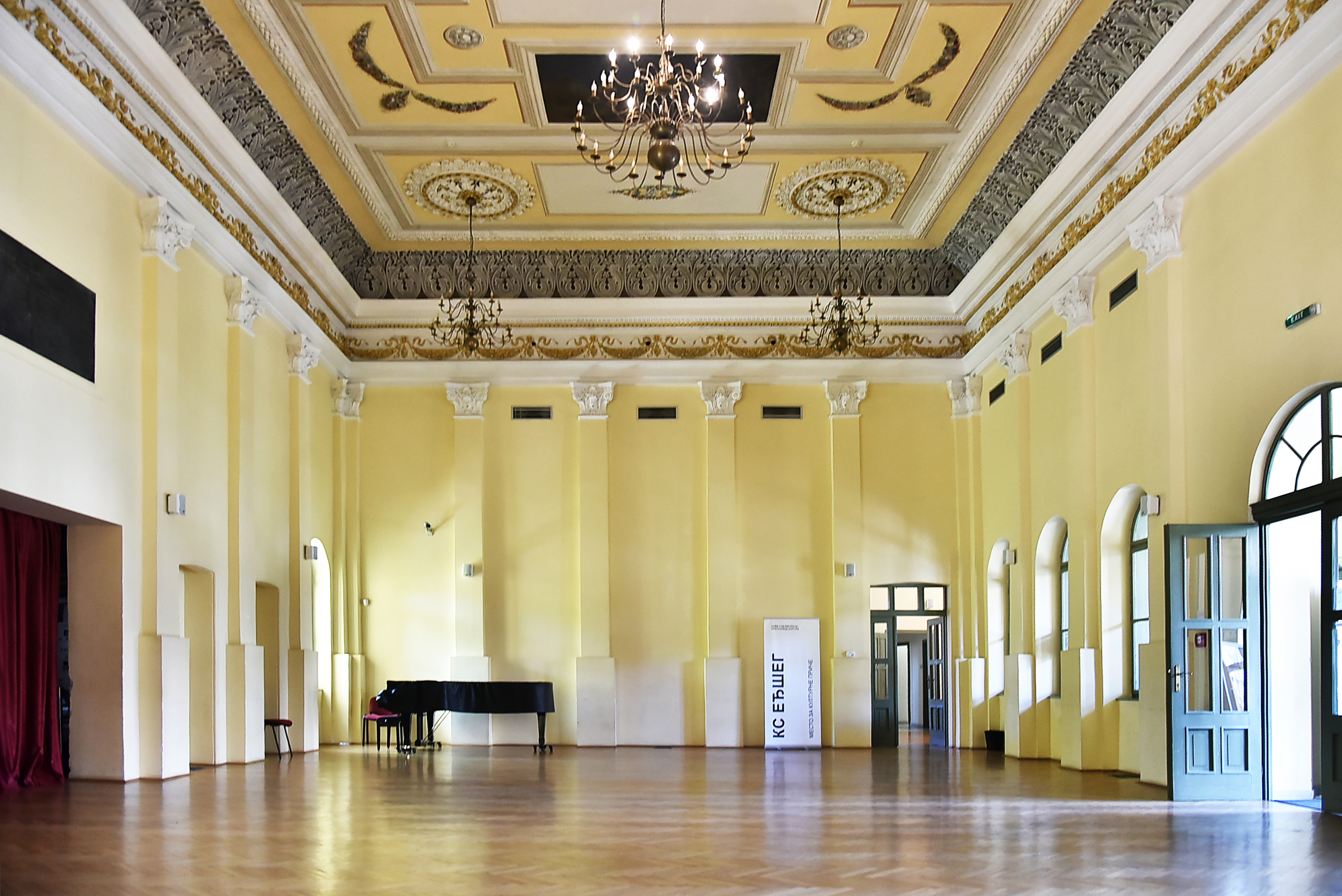
The main ballroom hall

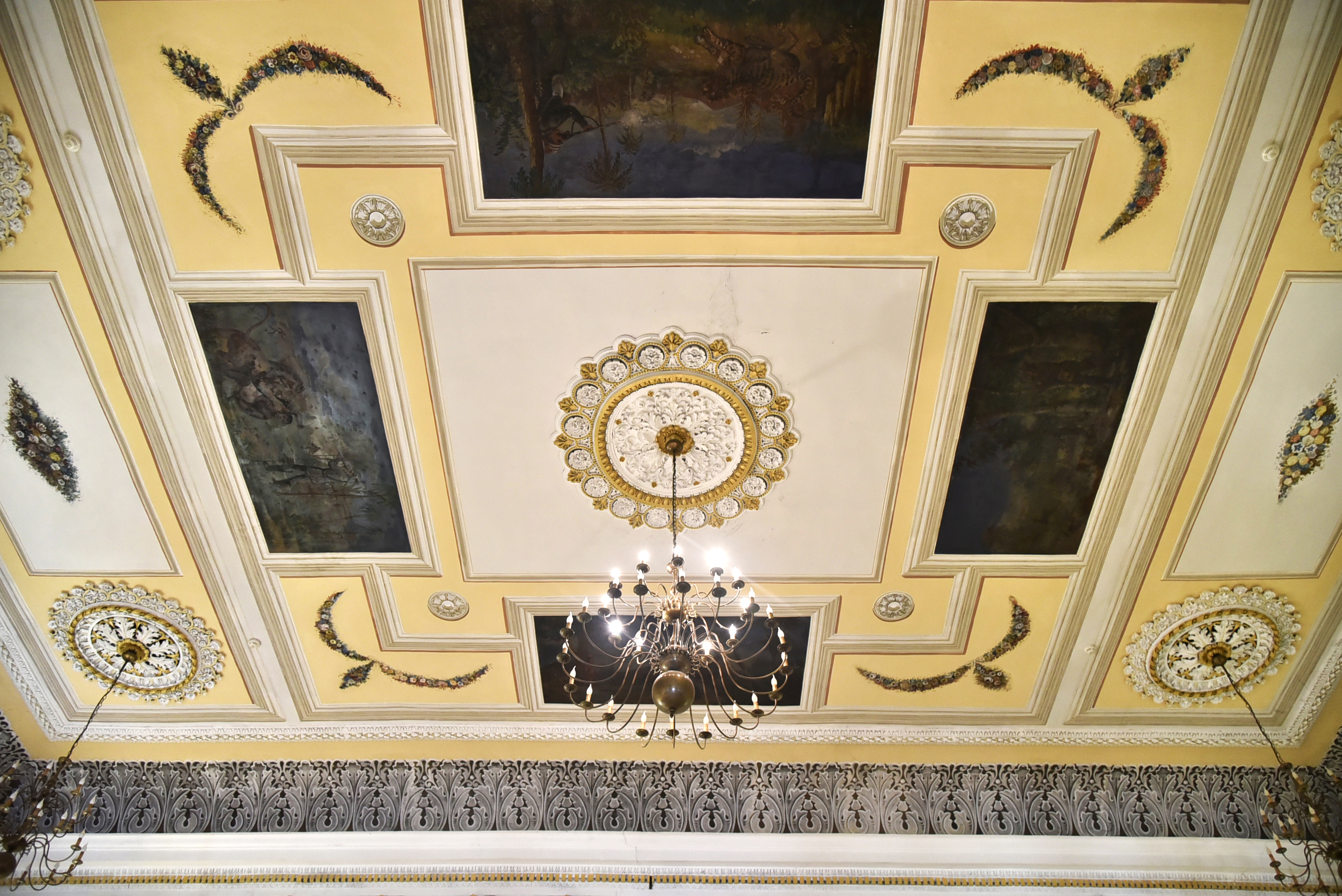
Ceiling decorations in the main ballroom hall
