= Elena Karaman Karić =

Serbian interior designer

- Born: 30 September 1971 (age 54); Belgrade, Serbia
- Occupation: Architect

Elena Karaman Karić (born 30 September 1971, Belgrade) is a Serbian interior designer, founder and chief designer of Lorca Design Interiors.

== Early career ==
As a teenager, she was modeling and doing promotional campaigns for various clients. Her face was on covers of many local fashion and glossy magazines in Yugoslavia, as well as the Dutch Vogue. In 1997, she launched and edited the lifestyle magazine Klik. She worked as a journalist and a host of the BK channel New Year program. She studied Defectology and Interior Design. She first started doing only interior design and later on she started designing furniture as well.

== Interior design ==
Elena is the founder and president of Lorca Design, a company based in London and Belgrade, dedicated to development of exclusive customized services in the field of interior design and handmade furniture.

In 2010, she opened a showroom in downtown Belgrade, presenting handmade pieces for interior decoration with her signature. Her portfolio comprises elite residential buildings, office buildings and luxury real estate projects. In Quintessentially Living 2011 issue, she is ranked among the 35 European design stars, designers and leaders of luxury design brands.

In early 2012, she exhibited her new furniture collection called Jazz, which was presented at the prestigious Belgrade gallery Progres.

== Personal life ==
Elena was married to Jugoslav Karić, an owner of a real-estate and development company in the United Kingdom, Russia and Serbia. They divorced in 2020. She has four children: Luka, Andrej (died in 2009), Matija and Simon; two of them with Predrag Mijatović.
