= Rotkvarija (Žitni Trg) =

Coordinates: 45.2588°N 19.8363°E

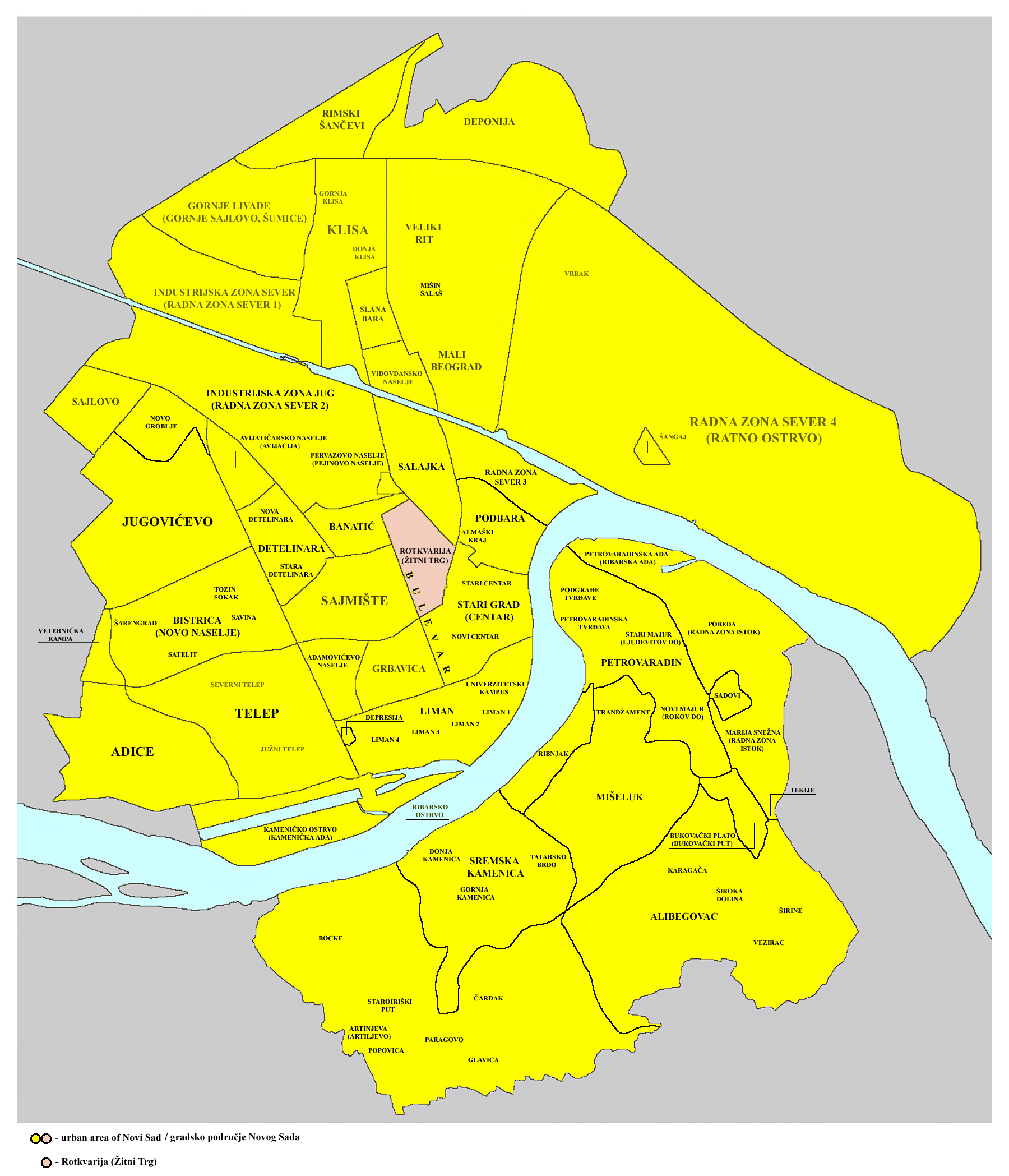
Map of the urban area of Novi Sad with city quarters, showing the location of Rotkvarija

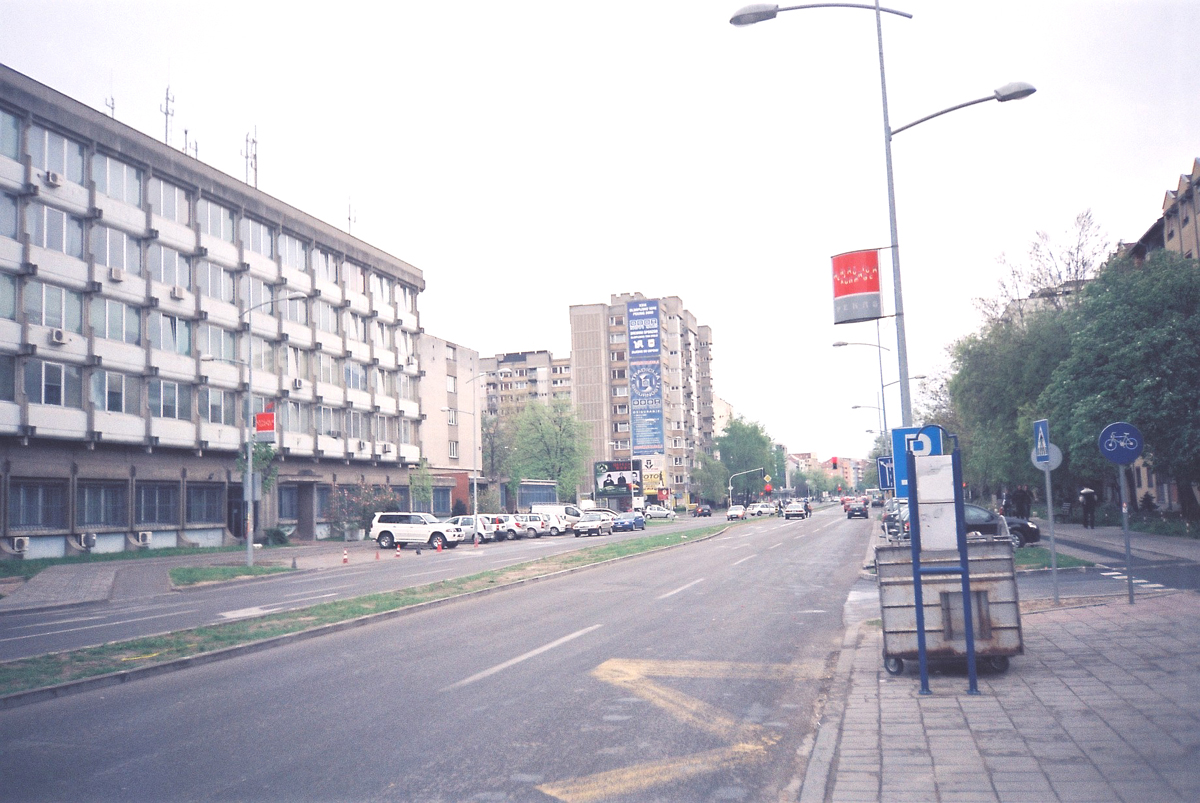
Rotkvarija

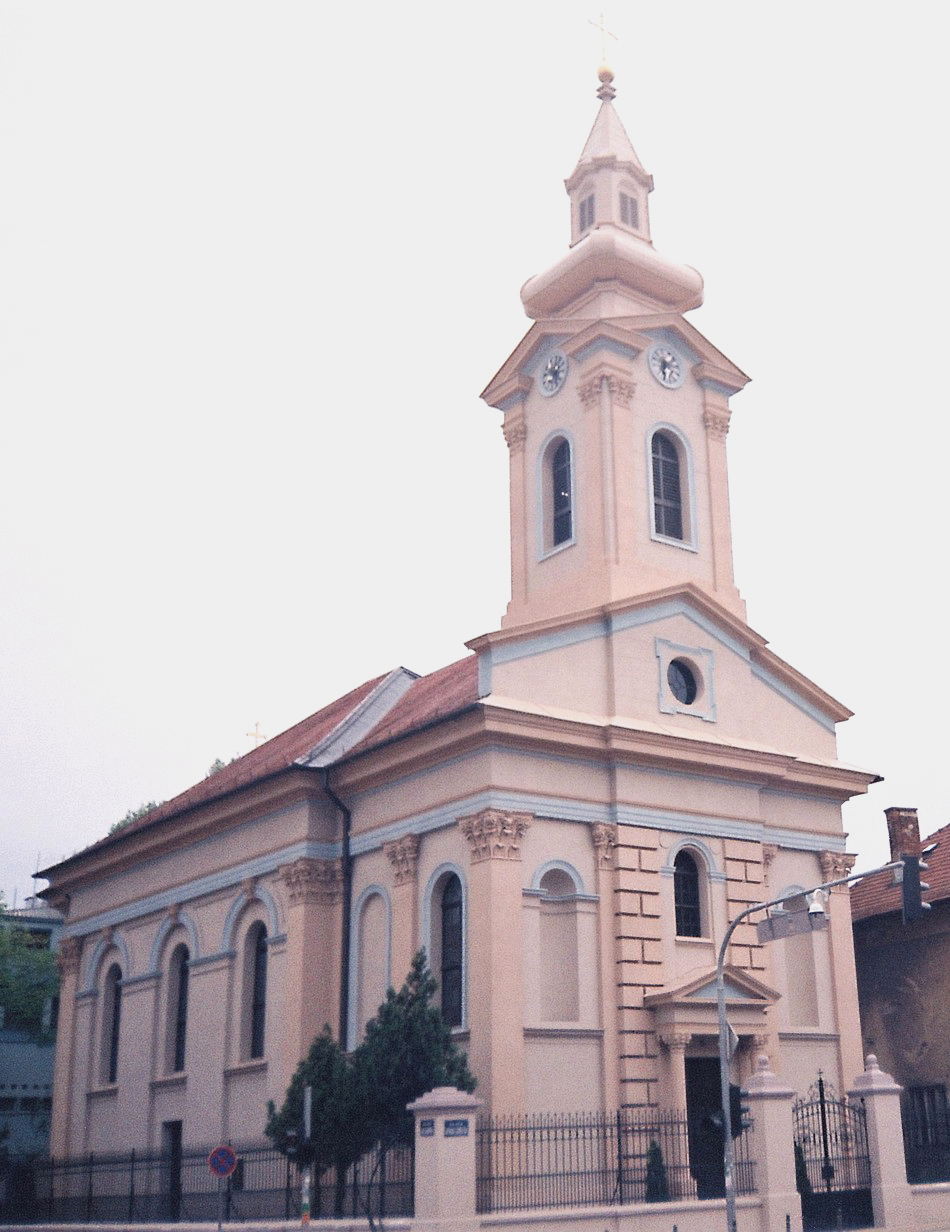
Evangelistic (Slovak) church in Rotkvarija

Rotkvarija (Serbian: Роткварија), also known as Žitni Trg (Serbian: Житни Трг), is an urban neighborhood of the city of Novi Sad, Serbia.

== Borders ==
The southern border of Rotkvarija is Jevrejska ulica (Jewish Street), the south-eastern borders are Šafarikova ulica (Šafarik Street) and Ulica Jovana Subotića (Jovan Subotić Street), the north-eastern border is Kisačka ulica (Kisač Street), the northern border is Bulevar Jaše Tomića (Jaša Tomić Boulevard), and the western border is Bulevar Oslobođenja (Liberation Boulevard).

== Neighbouring settlements ==
The neighbouring settlements are: Sajmište in the west, Banatić in the north-west, Salajka in the north-east, and Stari Grad in the south-east.

== History ==
Its old name was Jovanovski Kraj. It was named after a church dedicated to Sveti Jovan (Saint Jovan) that existed in the area until 1921 (the church was built in 1700 and was the oldest church in Novi Sad. It was burned in the 1848/49 revolution, but was rebuilt in 1853. In 1921, the church was razed).

The current name, Rotkvarija, derived from the fact that inhabitants of the neighborhood in the past were engaged in radish production (radish is known as "rotkva" in Serbian, hence the name). The third name of the neighborhood, Žitni Trg ("the grain marketplace" in English), derived from the grain market that existed here in the past.

== Features ==
Some of the important features of Rotkvarija are: Futoška pijaca (Futog Market), Reformer-Calvinist Church (built in 1865), and Slovak-Evangelist Church (built in 1886).

== Literature ==
- Milorad Grujić, Vodič kroz Novi Sad i okolinu, Novi Sad, 2004.
- Jovan Mirosavljević, Brevijar ulica Novog Sada 1745-2001, Novi Sad, 2002.

== See also ==
- Neighborhoods of Novi Sad

== Images ==
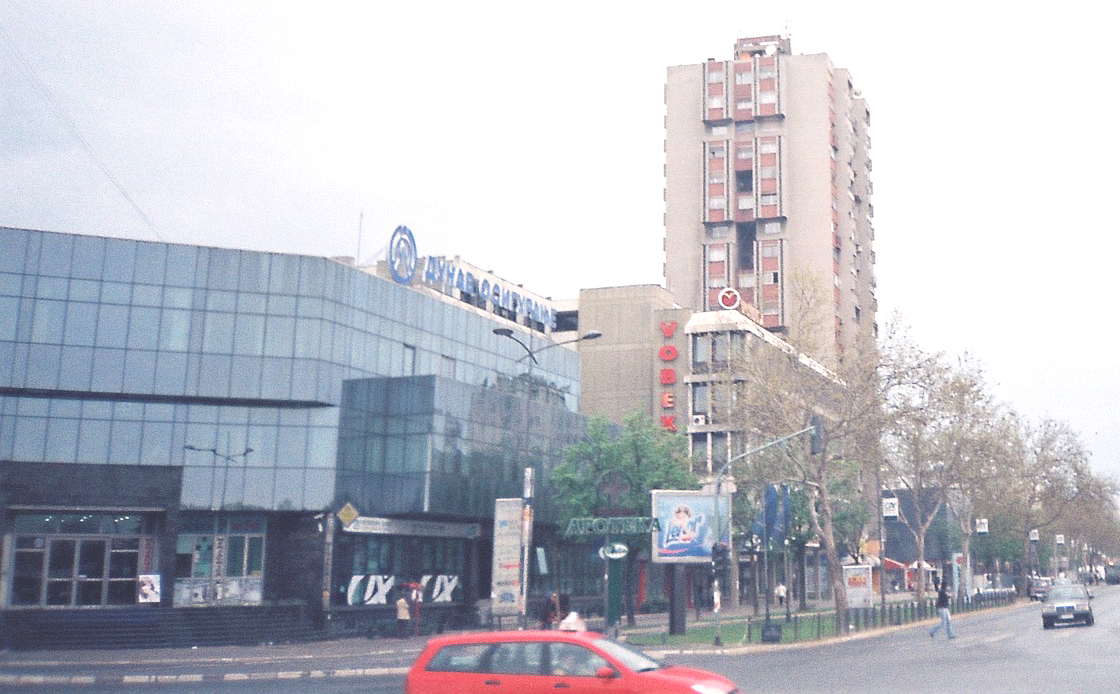
Rotkvarija

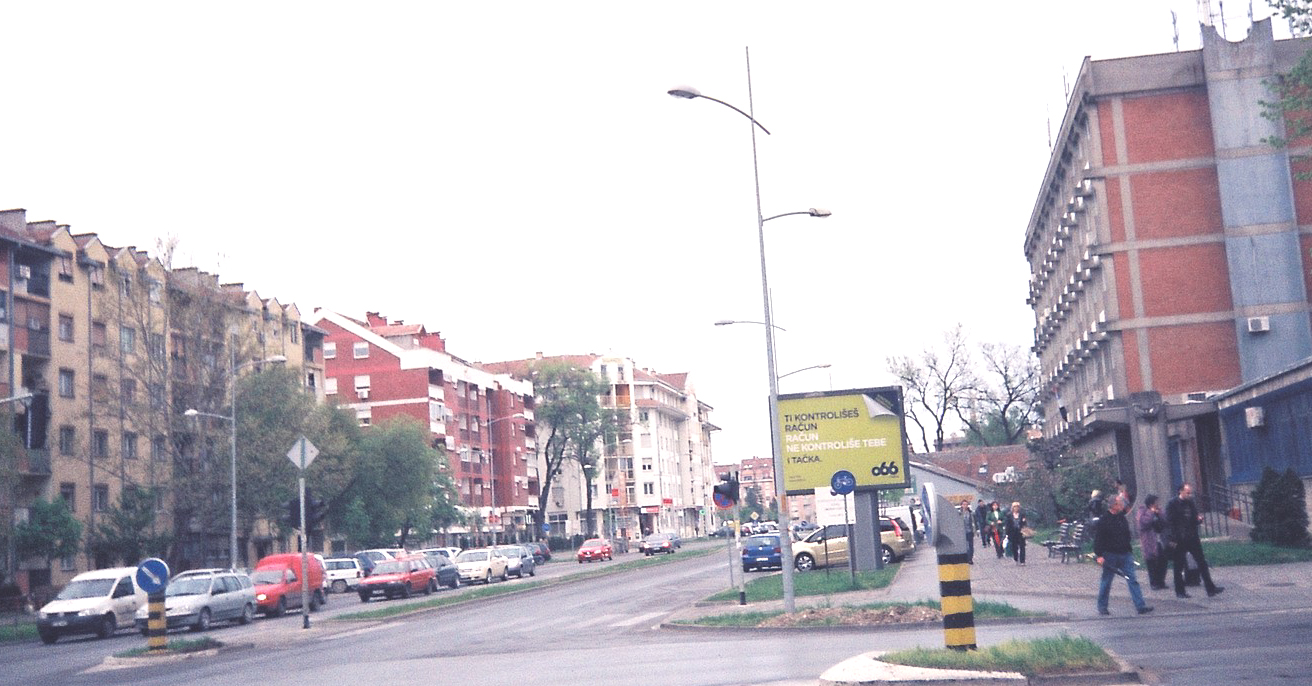
Rotkvarija

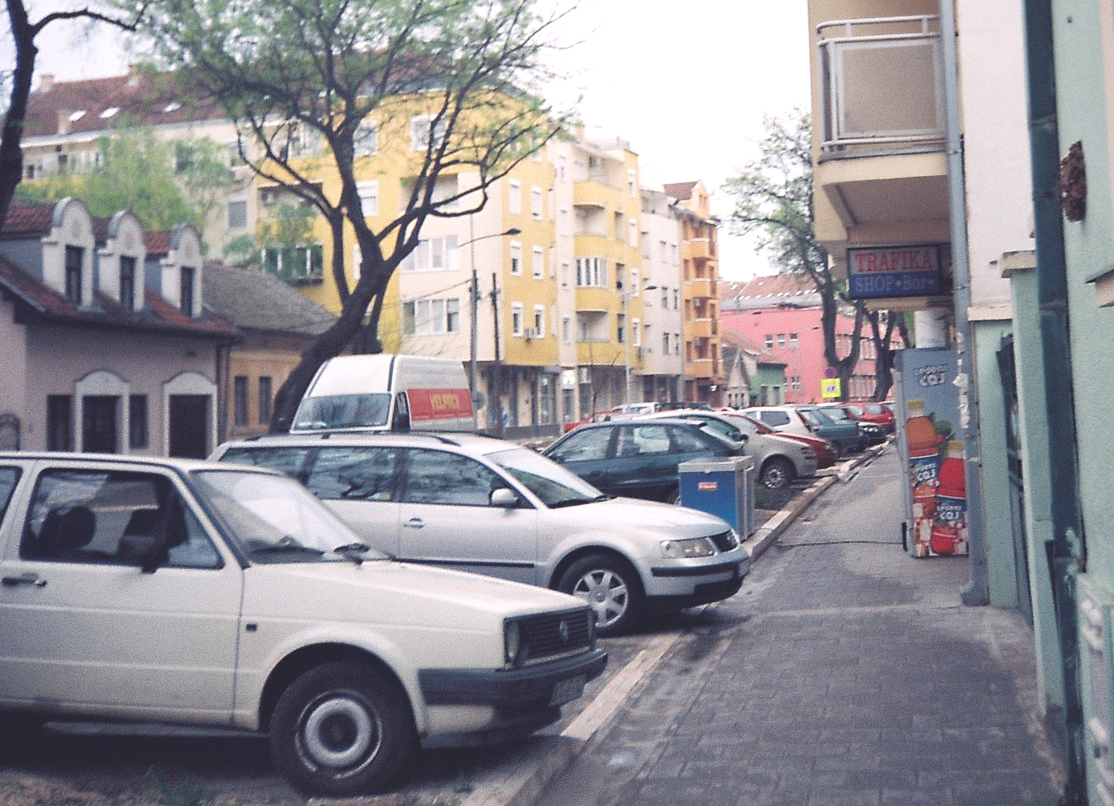
Rotkvarija

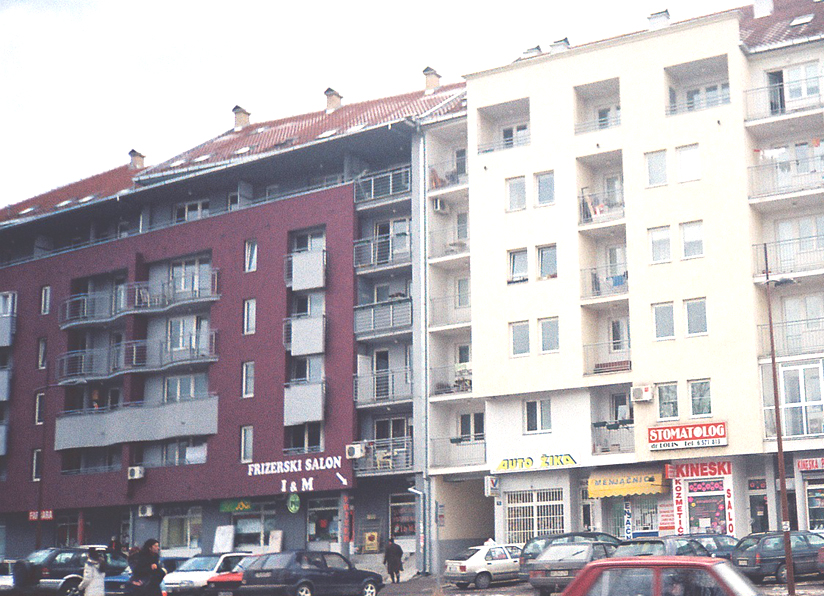
Rotkvarija

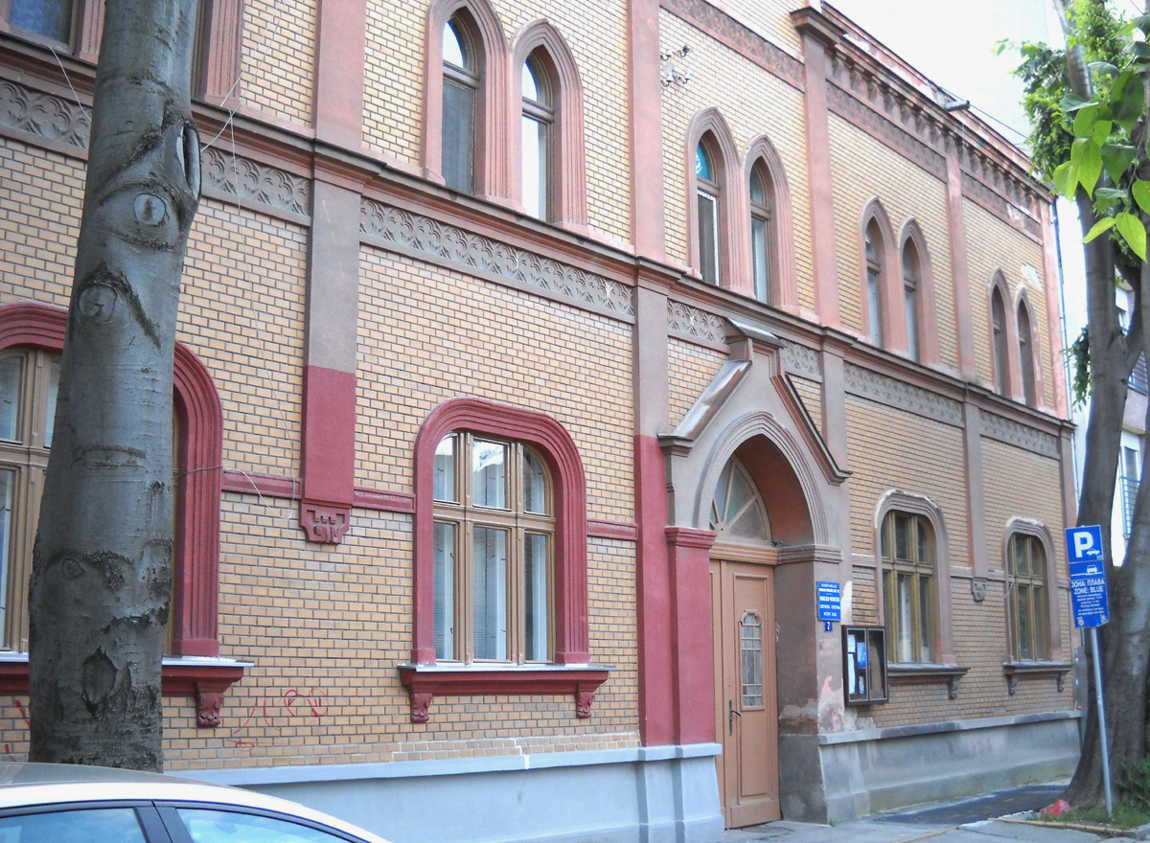
Evangelical Methodist Church in Rotkvarija

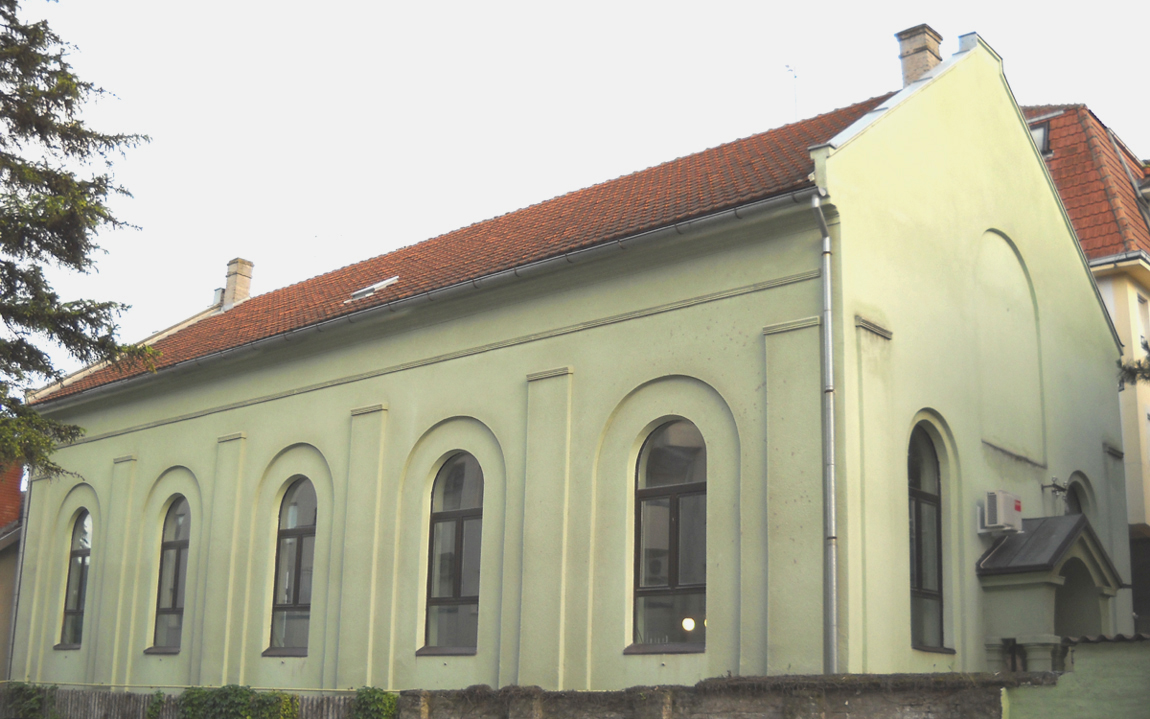
Prayer House of Nazarene Christian Community in Rotkvarija
