= Podbara =

Podbara Подбара
- Urban neighborhood
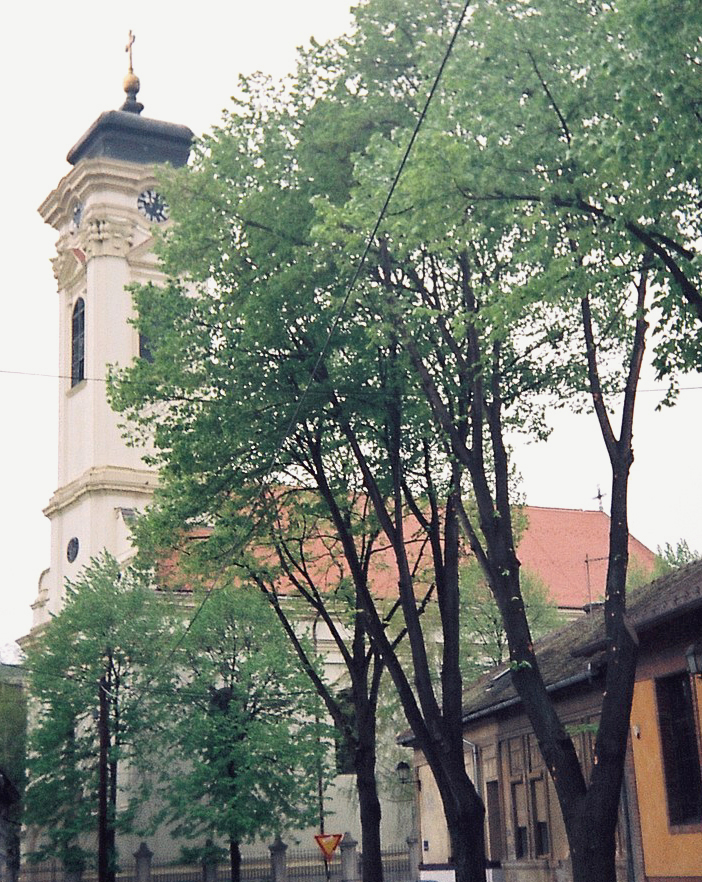
- Almaška Orthodox church, Podbara

- Location within Serbia
- Coordinates: 45.2627°N 19.8497°E
- Country: Serbia
- Province: Vojvodina
- District: South Bačka
- Municipality: Novi Sad

Area
  - Total: 0.86 km^{2} (0.33 sq mi)
- Time zone: UTC+1 (CET)
  - Summer (DST): UTC+2 (CEST)
- Area code: +381(0)21
- Car plates: NS

Podbara (Serbian: Подбара) is an urban neighborhood of the city of Novi Sad, Serbia.

== Borders ==
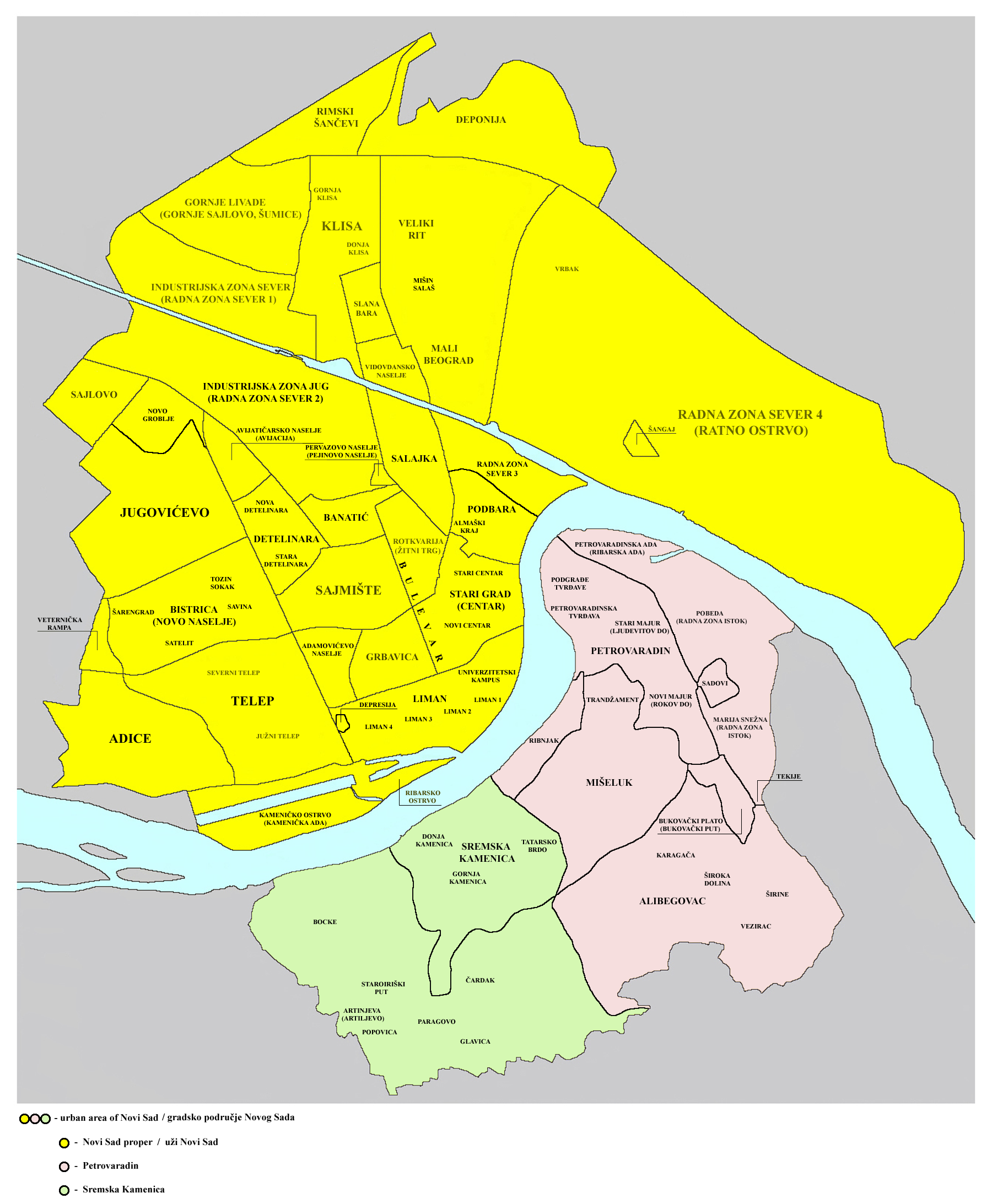
Map of the urban area of Novi Sad with city quarters, showing the location of Podbara

The southern borders of Podbara are Ulica Miloša Bajića (Miloš Bajić Street), Trg Republike (Square of the Republic), Daničićeva ulica (Daničić Street), Ulica Zlatne grede (Zlatna Greda Street), Pašićeva ulica (Pašić Street), Ulica Matice srpske (Matica Srpska Street), Sterijina ulica (Sterija Street), and Ulica Hadžić Svetića (Hadžić Svetić Street), the western border is Temerinska ulica (Temerin Street), the northern border is Danube-Tisa-Danube channel, and the eastern border is Danube river.

== Neighbouring city quarters ==
The neighbouring city quarters are: Stari Grad in the south, and Salajka in the west.

== Features ==
The industrial zone known as the Radna Zona Sever 3 is located in the north of Podbara. Almaška Church, an Orthodox church built in 1797 is situated in Podbara.

== Gallery ==
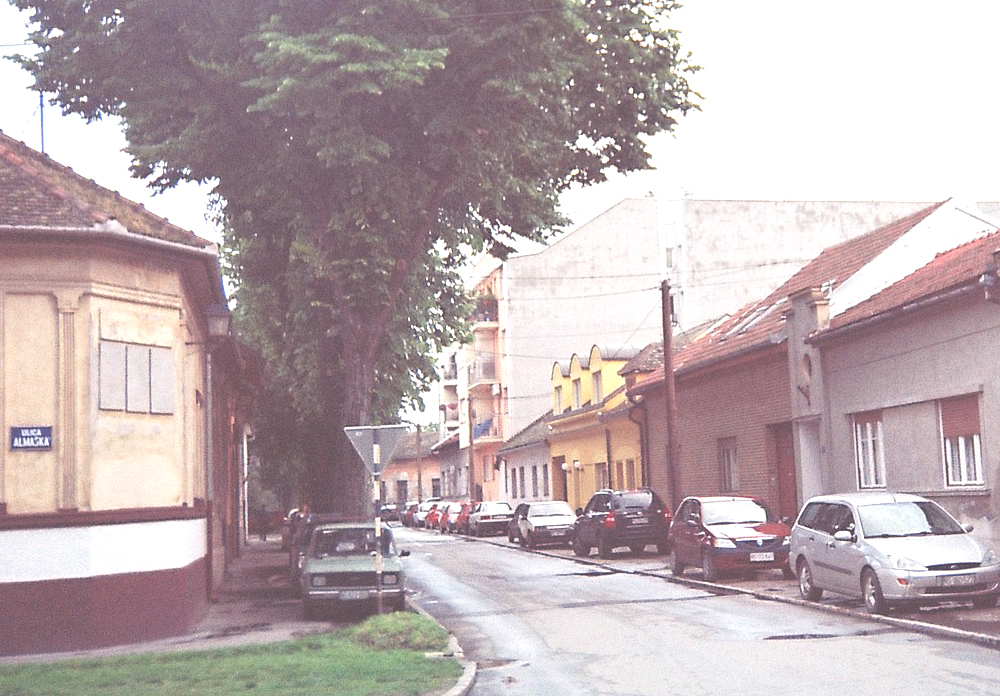
Podbara, Almaški Kraj

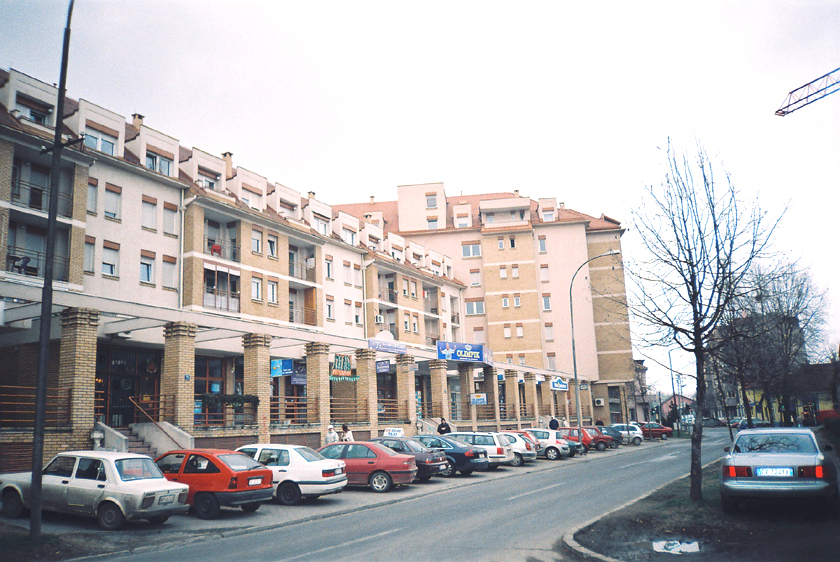
Podbara, Kosovska Street

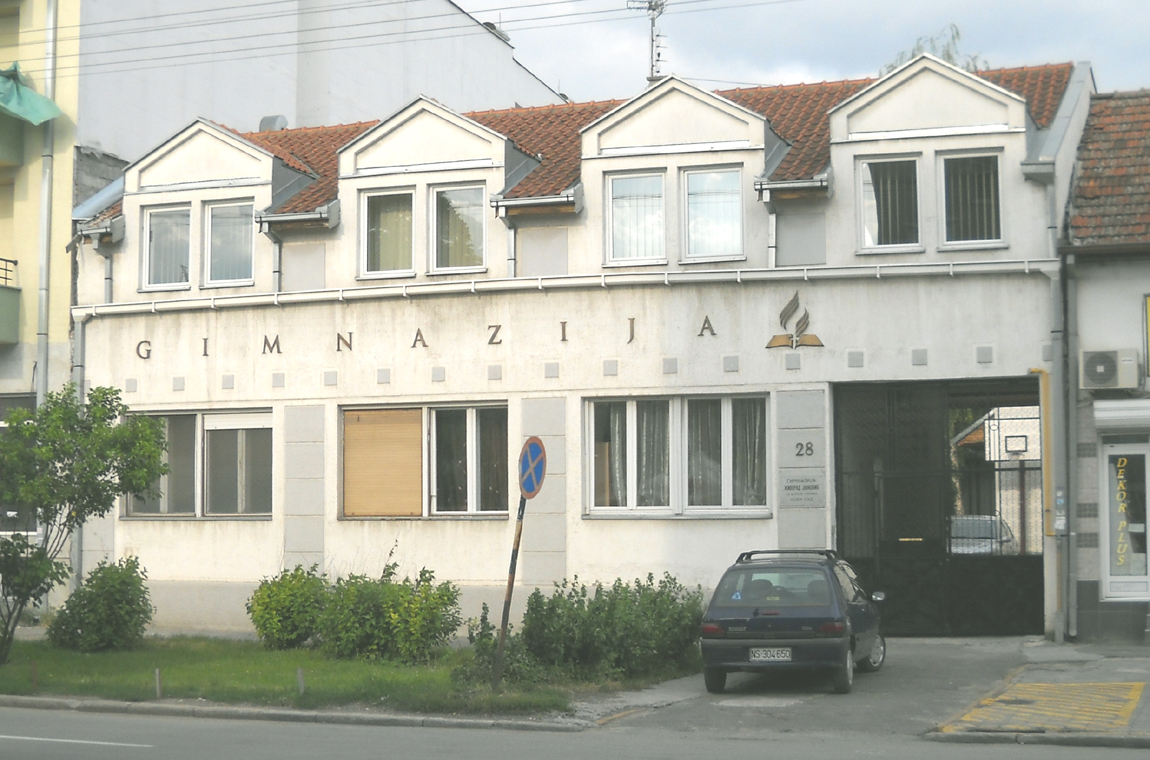
Adventist gymnasium "Živorad Janković"

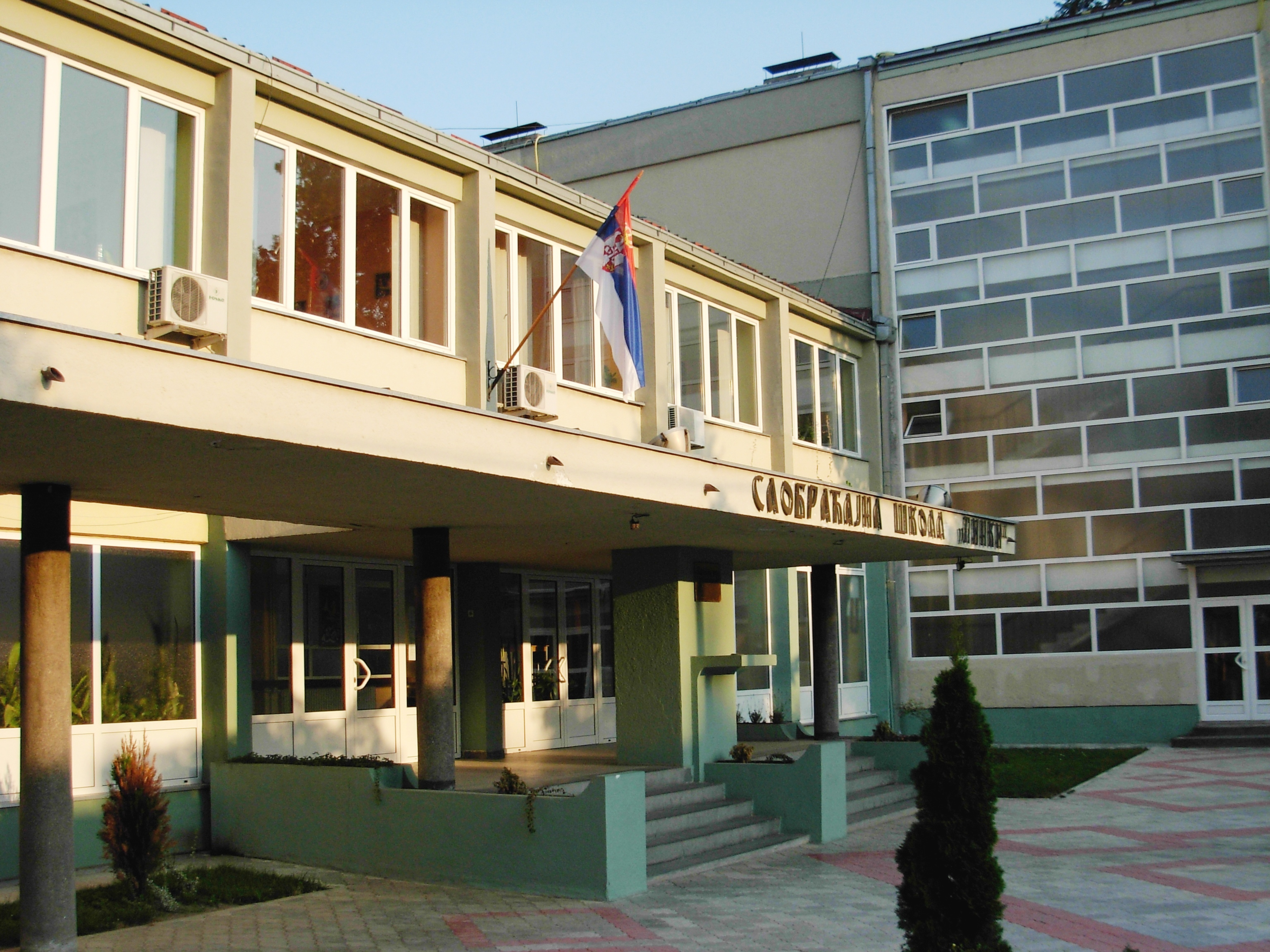
Traffic school "Pinki"

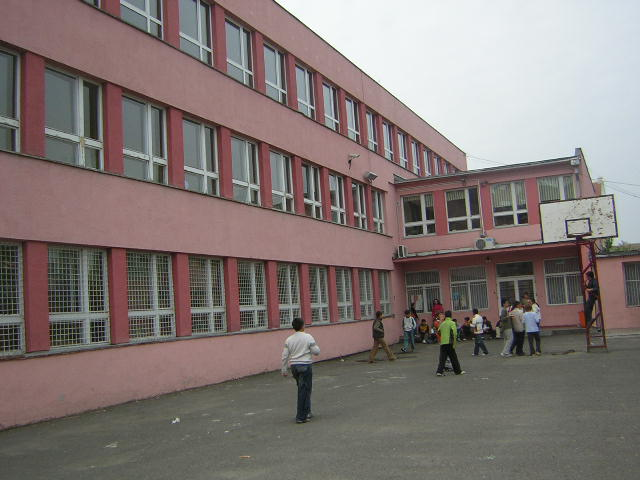
Elementary school "Ivan Gundulić"

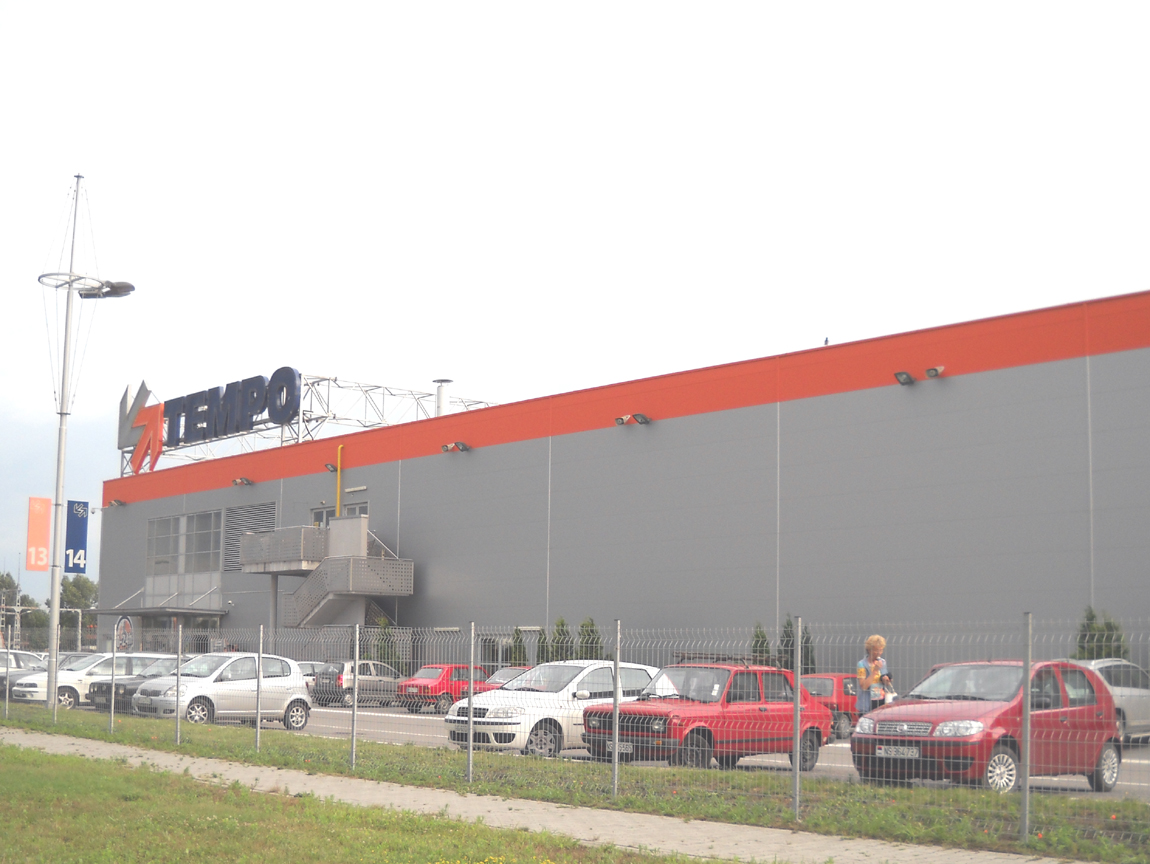
"Tempo" supermarket

== See also ==
- Neighborhoods of Novi Sad
