= Greek Catholic Church (Novi Sad) =

Church building in Novi Sad, Serbia

- Црква Светих апостола Петра и Павла
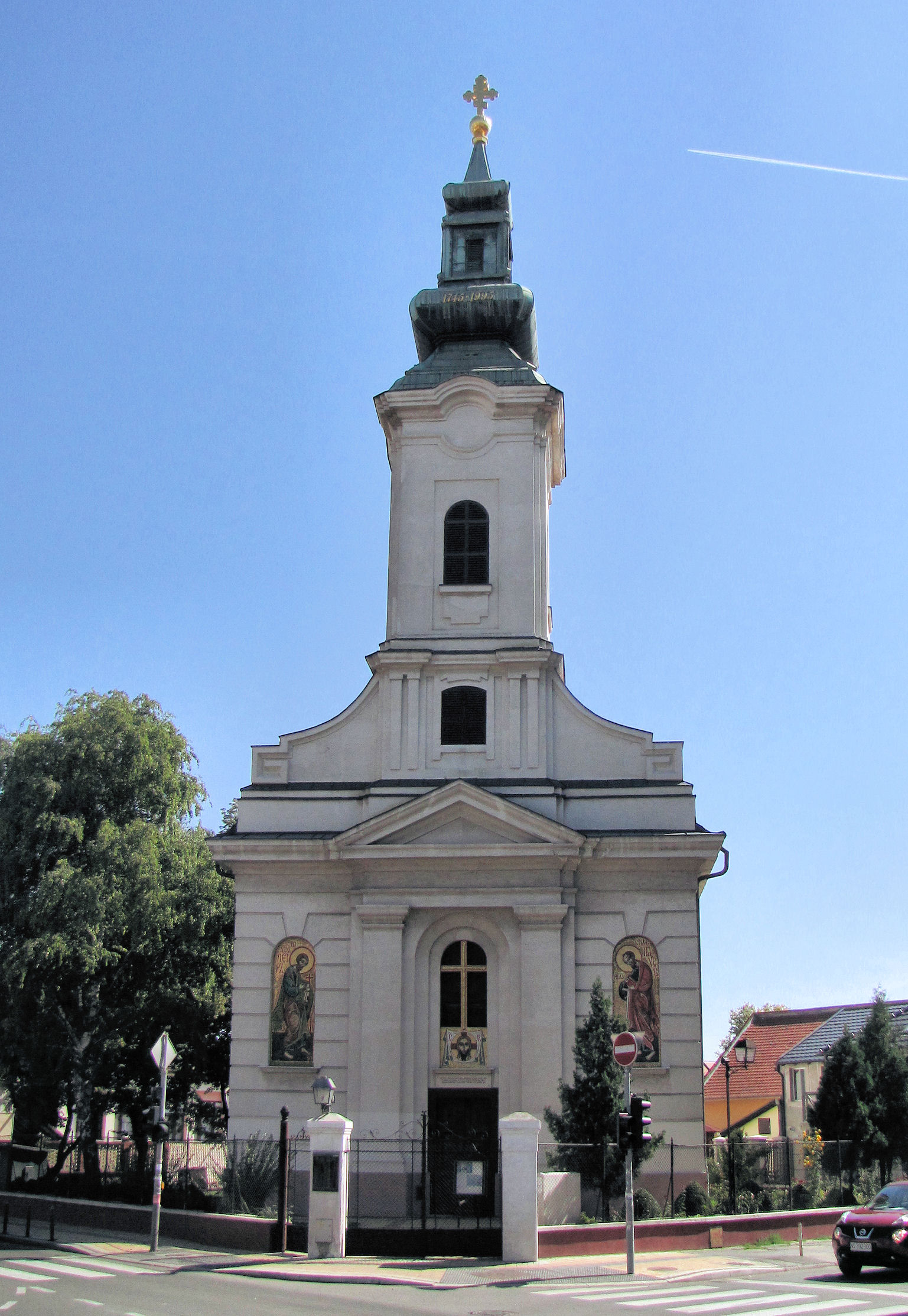
- Greek Catholic Church
- 45°15′29″N 19°50′32″E
- Address: Vojvode Bojovića 2, Novi Sad
- Country: Serbia
- Denomination: Greek Catholic

History
- Status: Parish church

Architecture
- Style: Baroque
- Years built: 1820–1847

Specifications
- Capacity: 300

Administration
- Diocese: Greek Catholic Eparchy of Ruski Krstur
- Parish: Novi Sad

The Greek Catholic Church (Serbian Cyrillic: Црква Светих апостола Петра и Павла, romanized: Crkva Svetih apostola Petra i Pavla) is a Greek Catholic church in Novi Sad, Serbia. Built in 1847, it is located in Stari Grad at the corner of Jovan Subotić and Svetozar Miletić streets. The church is consecrated to the Holy Apostles Peter and Paul and built in the Pannonian Baroque style. Its congregation consists mostly of Rusyns.

It is also known as the Uniat Church.

The icons are believed to have been painted by either Arsa Teodorović or Ivan Ivanić, while the iconostasis was carved by the Marković brothers. The church has 156 seats and can accommodate up to 300 people. The liturgy is celebrated in Church Slavonic, while the sermons are delivered in Rusyn and Ukrainian.

== History ==
The Greek Catholic parish in Novi Sad was established in 1780 and is part of the Greek Catholic Eparchy of Ruski Krstur.

The Greek Catholic Church was built in 1820–1847. Its most prominent priest was Jovan Hranilović. Along with the parish house across the street, it is one of the buildings that was not damaged in the 1849 bombardment that took place during the Serb uprising of 1848–1849, thanks to General Pavle Kiš, who himself was a Uniate.

In 1997, on the occasion of its 150th anniversary, the church underwent a complete renovation. The façade was adorned with three mosaic icons: St. Paul, St. Peter, and, at the center, Christ on the shroud with a cross above his head. The works were created by László Puskás, a professor of fine arts from Budapest.

== See also ==
- Religious architecture in Novi Sad
