= Stari Grad, Novi Sad =

Stari Grad Стари Град
- Urban neighborhood
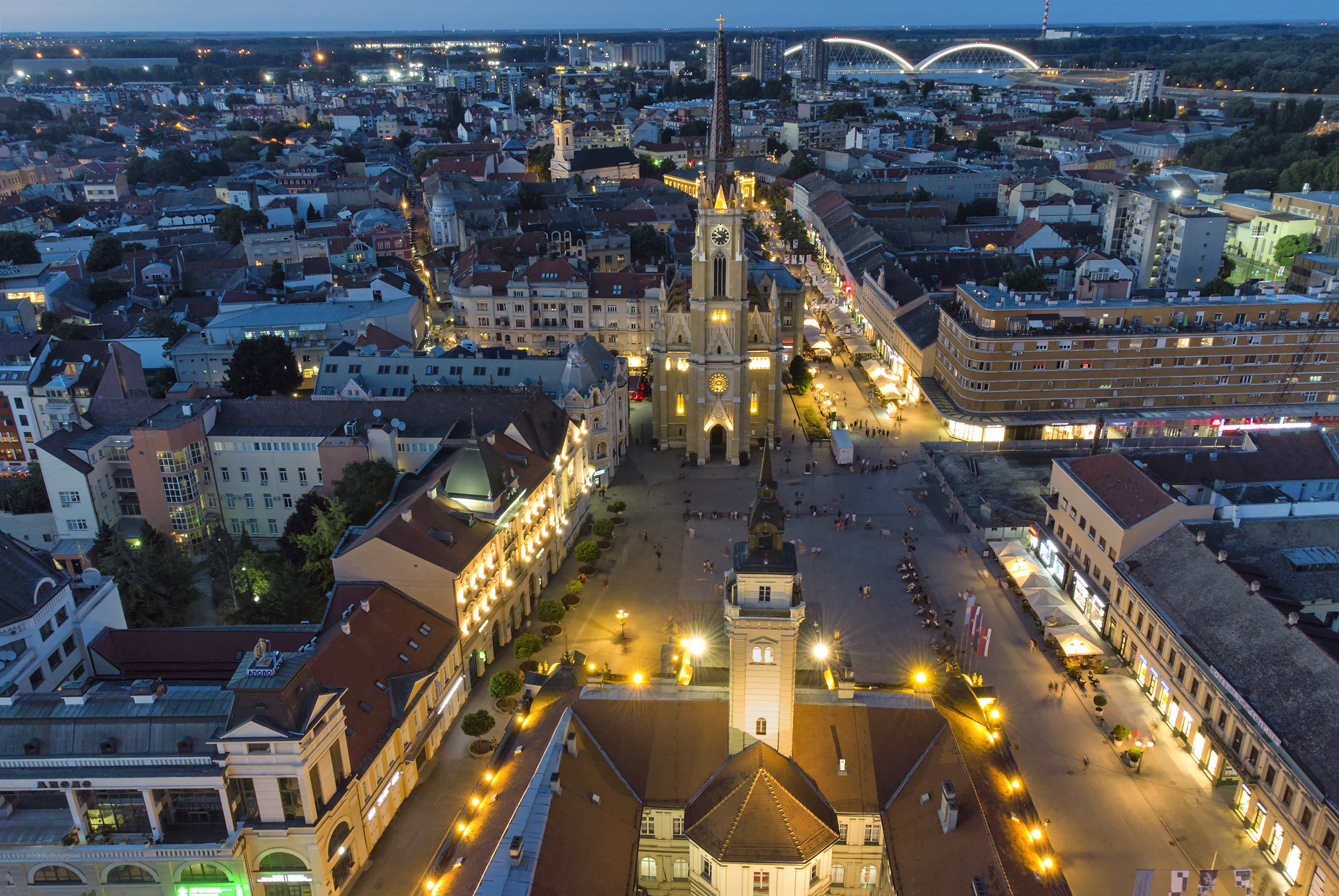
- Aerial view of Stari Grad
- Interactive map of Stari Grad
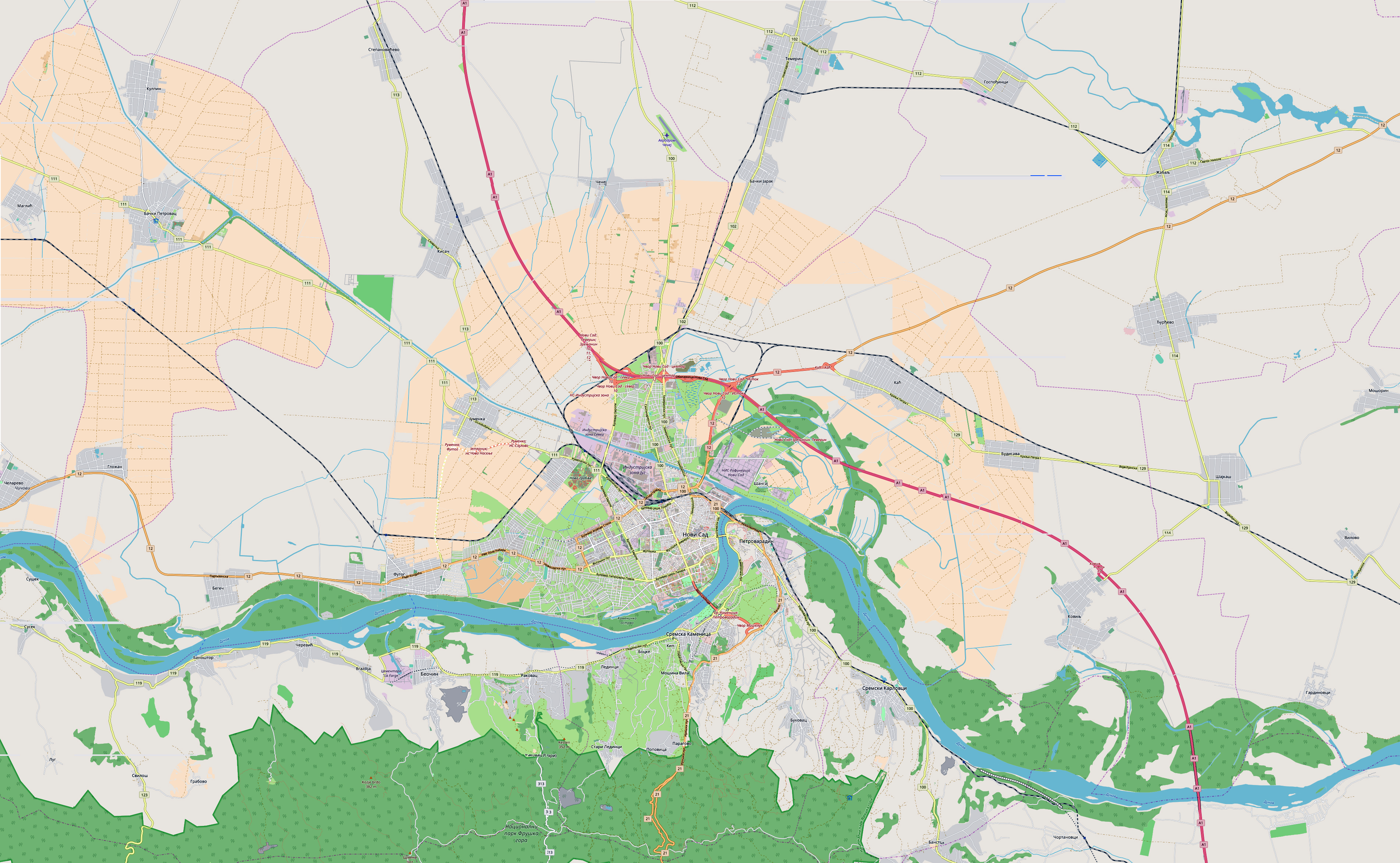
- Location within Novi Sad
- Coordinates: 45.2566°N 19.8480°E
- Country: Serbia
- Province: Vojvodina
- District: South Bačka
- Municipality: Novi Sad

Area
  - Total: 0.62 km^{2} (0.24 sq mi)

Population (2022)
  - Total: 18,506
  - Density: 30,000/km^{2} (77,000/sq mi)
- Time zone: UTC+1 (CET)
  - Summer (DST): UTC+2 (CEST)
- Area code: +381(0)21
- Car plates: NS

Stari Grad (Serbian Cyrillic: Стари Град) is an urban neighborhood and the city center of Novi Sad, Serbia. In the Serbian language, the name "Stari Grad" means "Old Town".

== Location ==
=== Borders ===
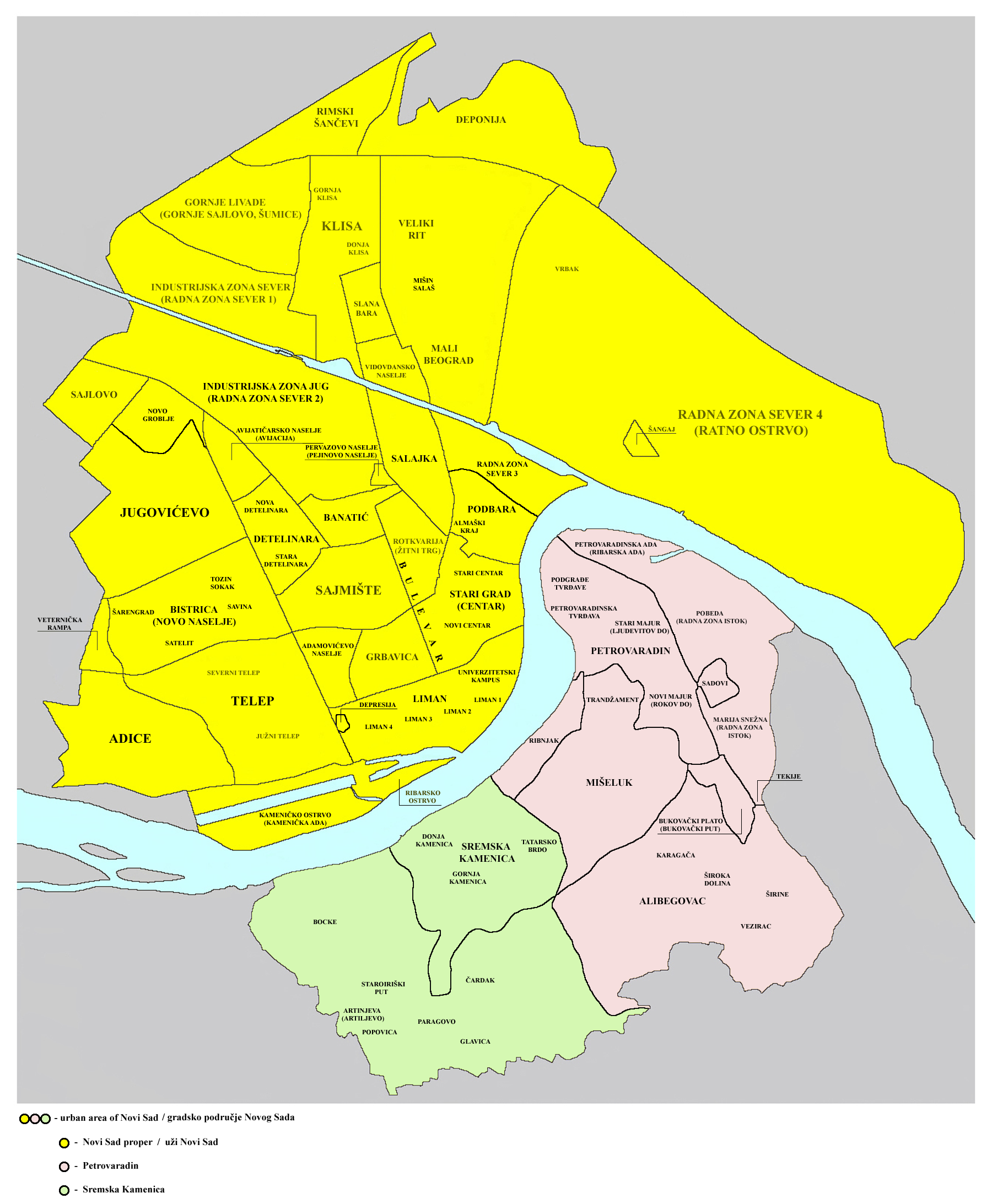
Map of the urban area of Novi Sad with city quarters, showing the location of Stari grad

The eastern borders of Stari grad are Kej žrtava racije (Quay of the victims of raid) and Beogradski kej (Belgrade Quay), the southern border is Bulevar Cara Lazara (Tzar Lazar Boulevard), the western border is Bulevar oslobođenja (Liberation Boulevard), the north-western borders are Jevrejska ulica (Jewish Street), Šafarikova ulica (Šafarik Street), Ulica Jovana Subotića (Jovan Subotić Street), and Temerinska ulica (Temerin Street), and the northern borders are Ulica Miloša Bajića (Miloš Bajić Street), Trg Republike (Square of the Republic), Daničićeva ulica (Daničić Street), Ulica Zlatne grede (Zlatna Greda Street), Pašićeva ulica (Pašić Street), Ulica Matice srpske (Matica Srpska Street), Sterijina ulica (Sterija Street), and Ulica Hadži Svetića (Hadži Svetić Street).

The neighbouring settlements are: Podbara in the north, Salajka, Rotkvarija and Grbavica in the west, and Liman in the south. In the east of the settlement is the river Danube.

=== Parts of the neighborhood ===
Stari grad (City Centre) is divided into the Old Centre and the New Centre, and the border between these two parts of the settlement is Bulevar Mihajla Pupina (Mihajlo Pupin Boulevard). The Old Centre is located on the northern side of this Boulevard, while the New Centre is located on the southern side.

One of the oldest parks in town, the Danube Park, is located in Stari grad.

== History ==
=== Ancient times ===
A part of a Bronze Age Necropolis (2000-95 B.C.E.) was found at the site of the Library of Matica srpska.

=== Medieval times ===
In the medieval period (13th-16th century), a settlement named Bakša (Baksa, Baksafalva, Bakšić) existed at this location.

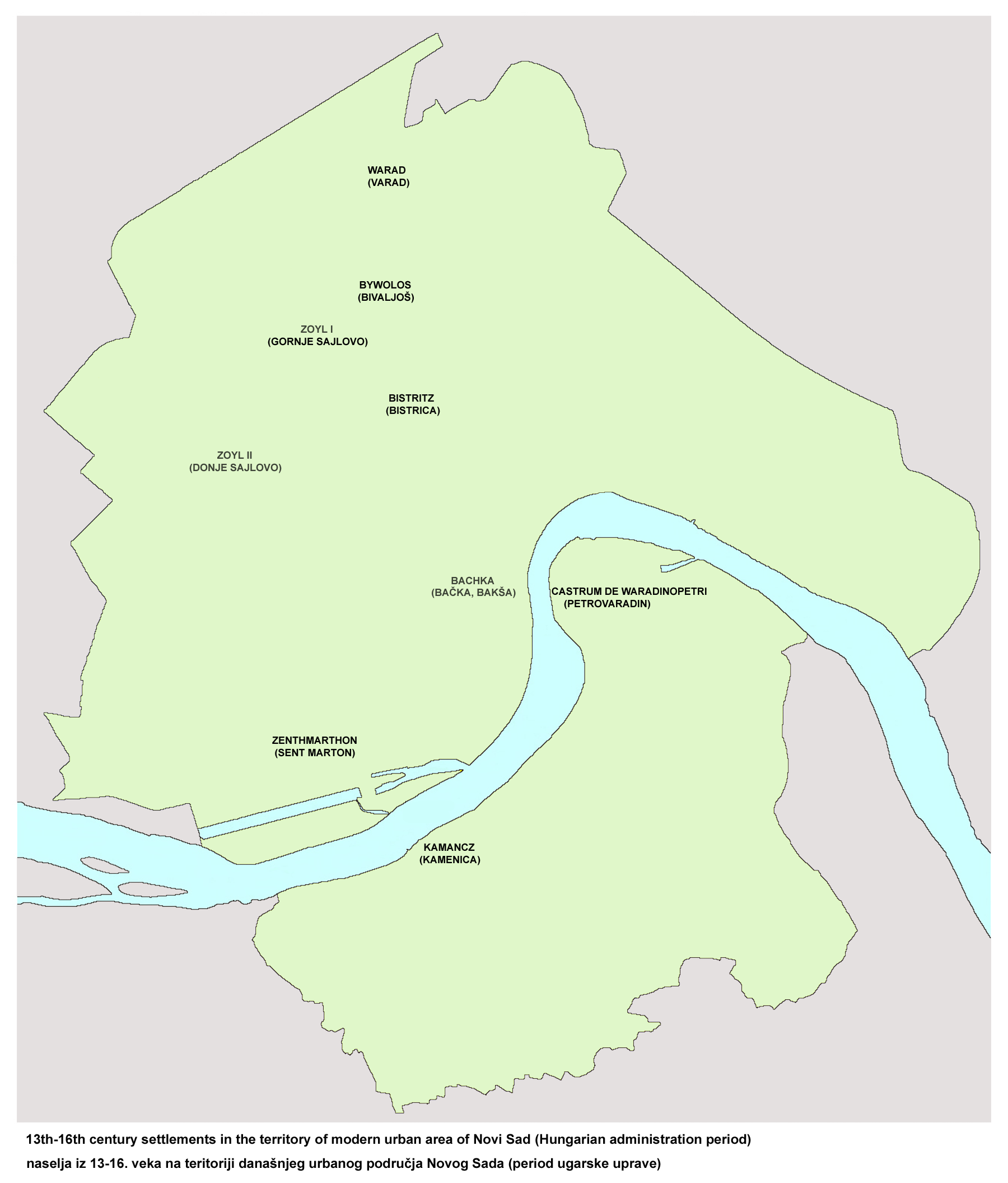
Medieval settlement of Bakša in the location of modern Stari grad (13th-16th century)

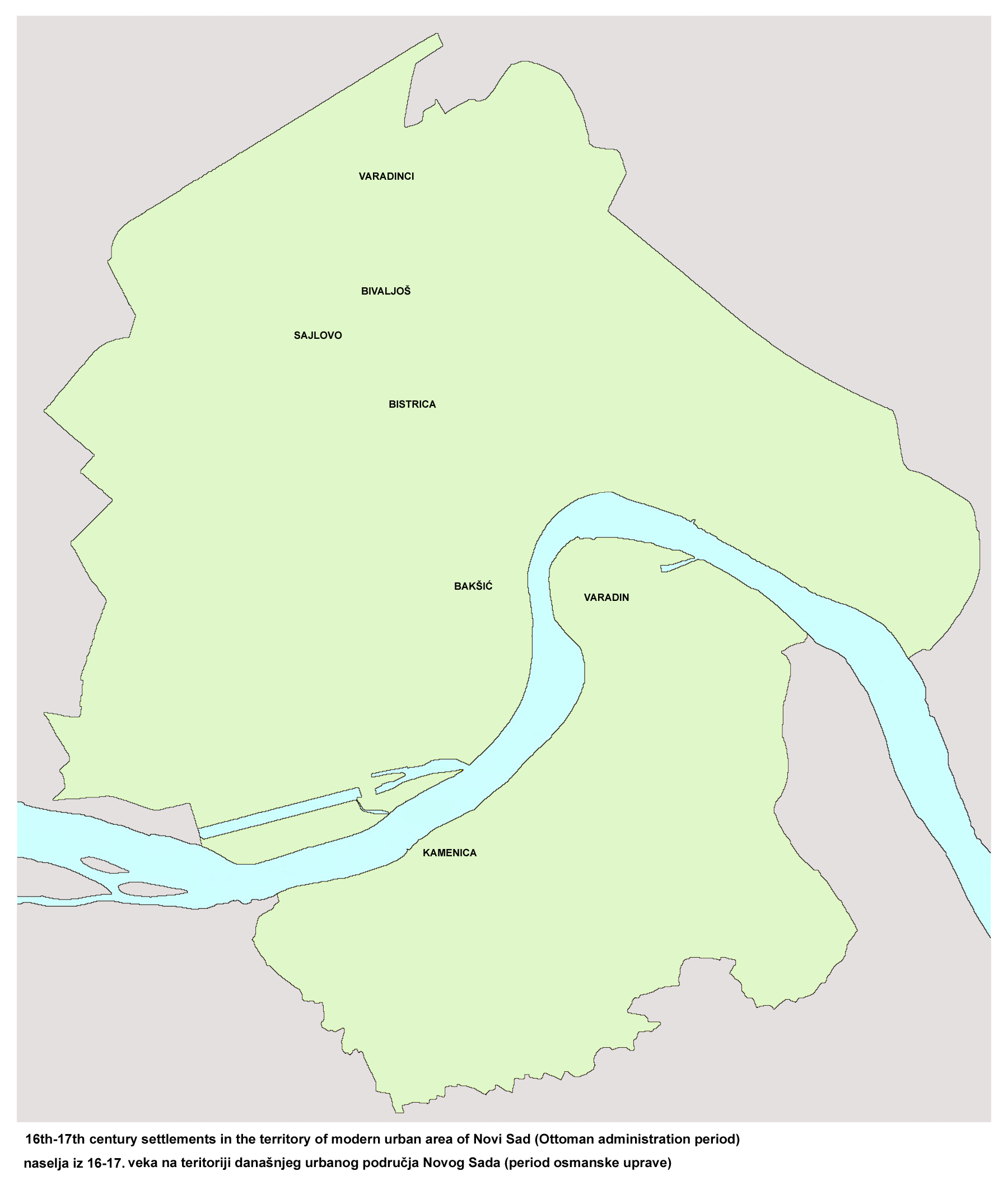
Settlement of Bakšić in the location of modern Stari grad during Ottoman administration (16th-17th century)

=== Birth of Stari grad ===
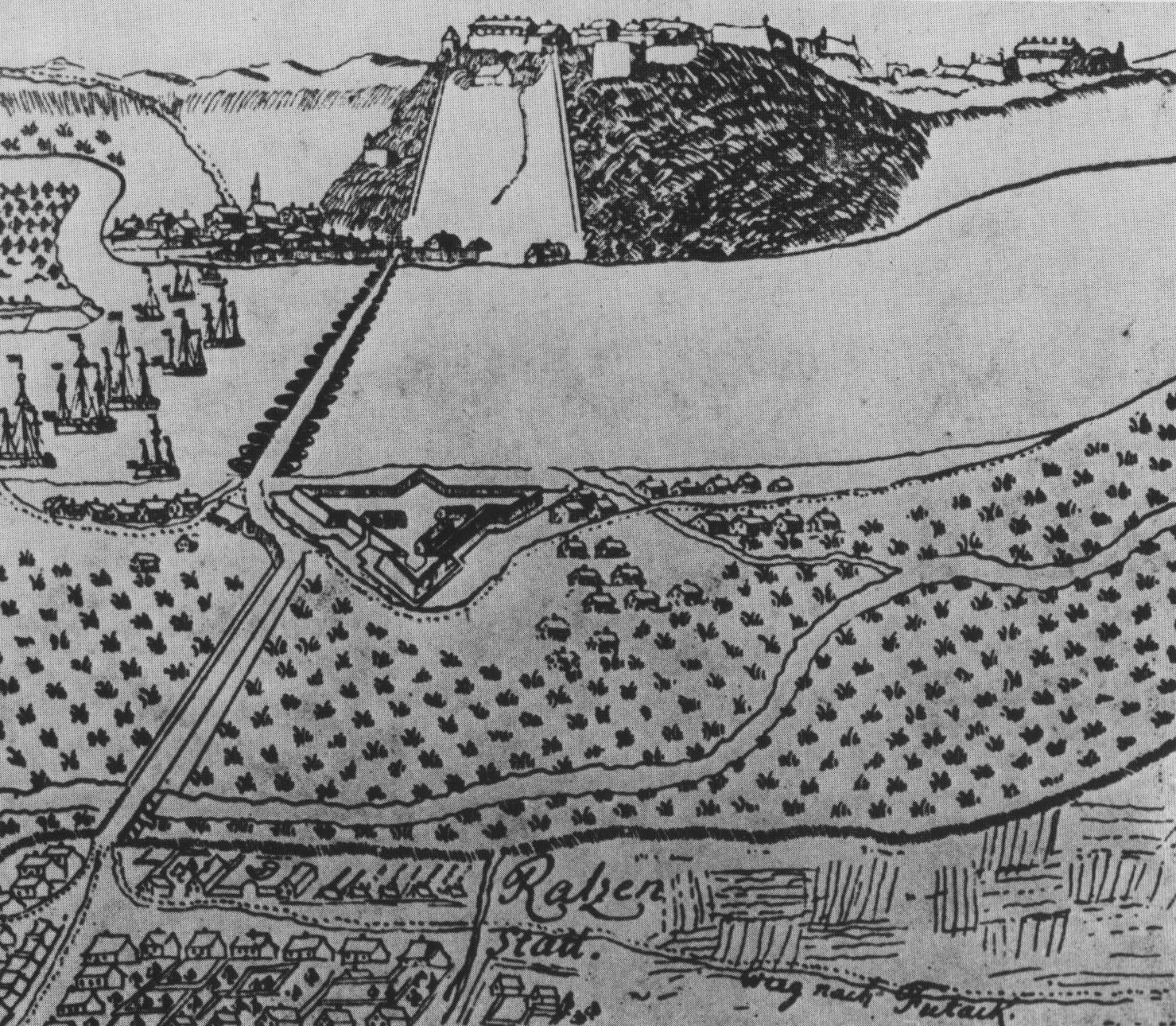
Ratzen Statt (Novi Sad) in 1698

The settlement from which Stari grad (and Novi Sad) developed was founded in 1694. This settlement was known as Racka varoš or Petrovaradinski Šanac and was part of the Danube military frontier. The original area of Petrovaradin Šanac was in the northwest part of today's Stari grad and the southwest part of today's Podbara. Until the middle of the 19th century, the settlement mainly expanded to the west, where new urban districts — Rotkvarija, Salajka and Grbavica — were formed, and only later expanded to the east and south, so that some parts of today's Stari grad are newer in origin than some neighboring urban districts.

=== Little and Great Limans ===
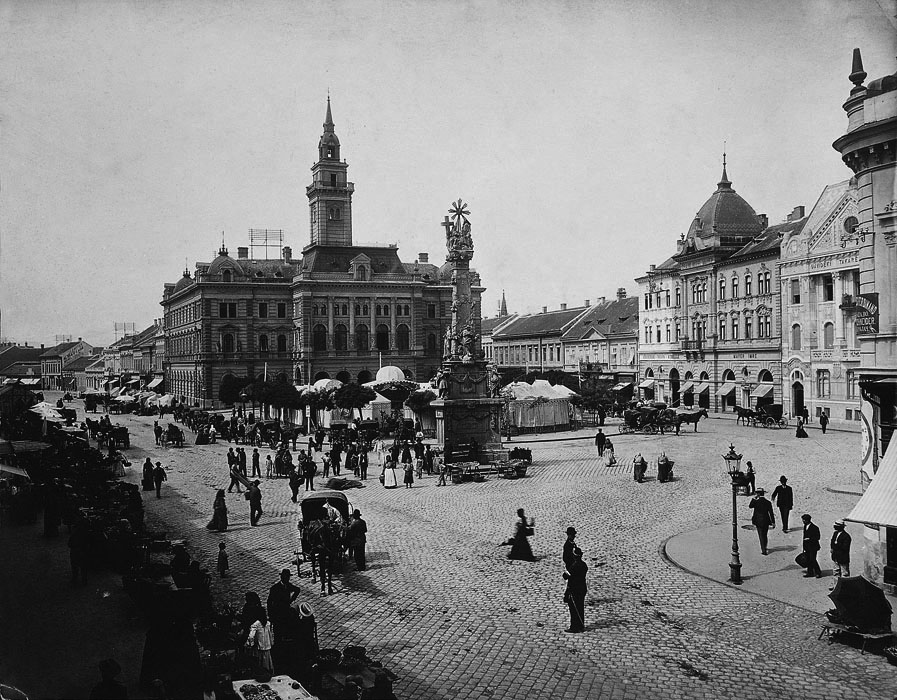
City Hall and Town Square in 1900

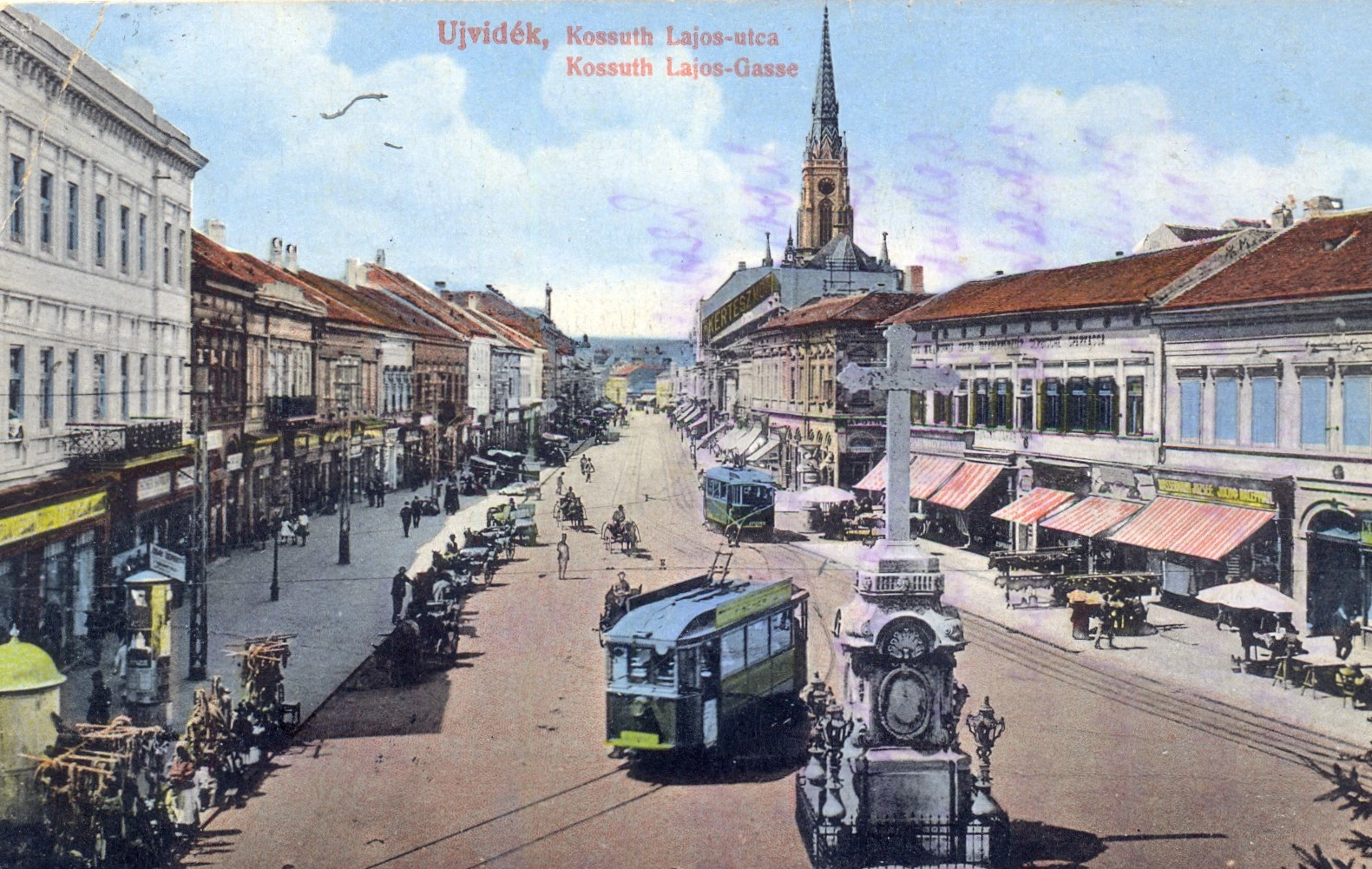
Post card of Lajoša Košuta Street, Stari grad, Novi Sad, early 20th century

In The General Urban Plan of 1845, the eastern border of the city's area was made up of the streets of Alekse Šantića, Želežnička, Narodnog heroja and Zmaj Jovina.

The major expansion of the city centre towards the south and east occurred only after World War I and World War II, when Stari grad was given its present appearance.

The southeastern part of today's Stari grad in the past was called "Mali Liman" (Little Liman) and "Veliki Liman" (Great Liman), which most of which is part of modern day Liman neighborhoods. Up until the early 1930s, the Little Liman contained ponds, sandbars, water plants, willows and meadows.

Little Liman covered today's Danube Park and the area along the Danube towards the former railway embankment, under which were the underpasses that connected to the Great Liman. The area of Little Liman was framed by the Danube, the Danube Street, the Zmaj Jovina Street, the King Alexander Street and the railway embankment (today's Tsar Lazar Boulevard).

In Little Liman, fishing from boats was common, and along the Danube, towards the Fortress, there was a collection of buildings called the Brukšanac (Bruckschanc), a small fortification that provided protection for a pontoon bridge. A few hundred meters upstream was the first city beach, with a wooden building on the water. This beach was later torn down to make room for the city flood embankment. The new city beach called Štrand would open in 1911 and would is located in what is today the banks of the Liman neighborhood. The name Little Liman was completely lost when the terrain was fully built and thus the central city core connected to the Danube.

== Population ==
According to the data from JKP Informatika Novi Sad for 2010, the population of Stari grad was 17,383 residence. The registered residence in there three local communities were: "Stari grad" with 4,153; "Sonja Marinković" with 6,162; "Prva vojvođanska brigada" with 7,523.

Since 2022, Star grad neighborhood in total has about 18,506 residents registered in its three local communities: "Stari grad" with 3,963; "Sonja Marinković" with 6,088; "Prva vojvođanska brigada" with 8,455.

== Local Communities ==
Stari grad is part of Novi Sad municipality, and since 1989 it is administratively divided into three local communities:

- "Stari grad", located in King Alexander I Street, encompasses most of the core city center in the northern part of the neighborhood;
- "Sonja Marinković", located in Žrtava racije Quay 4, encompasses most of the south eastern part of the neighborhood towards the Danube and bordering Žarka Zrenjanina Street and Stražilovska Street.
- "Prva vojvođanska brigada", located in Dimitrija Abramovića 8, encompasses most of the south western part of the neighborhood towards the Liberation Boulevard and bordering Žarka Zrenjanina Street and Stražilovska Street.

Between 1980 and 1989, Stari grad was one of the seven municipalities of Novi Sad City. The municipality included the city quarter of Stari grad, part of Rotkvarija, and part of Liman.

== Buildings ==
Some of the important buildings located in Stari grad are: City Hall, Bishop's Palace, Banovina Palace, Spens Sports Center, Vojvodina football stadium.

== Culture ==
=== Churches ===
A churches located in Stari grad: Name of Mary Catholic Church, Minster Orthodox Church, Nikolajevska Orthodox Church, Saint George's Orthodox Cathedral, Uspenska Orthodox Church, Novi Sad Synagogue, Greek Catholic Church.

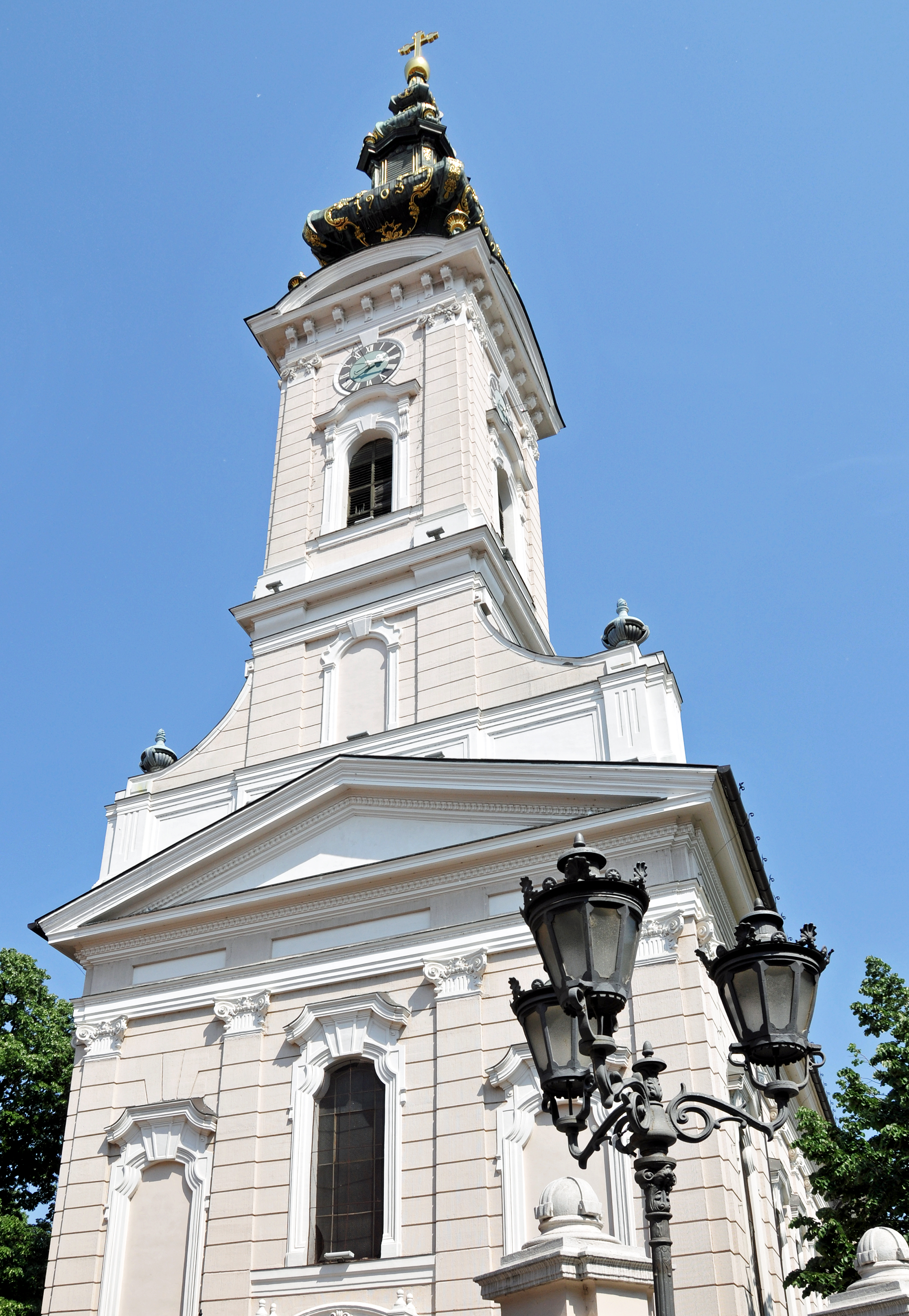
Saint George's Orthodox cathedral (Saborna crkva) in Stari Grad

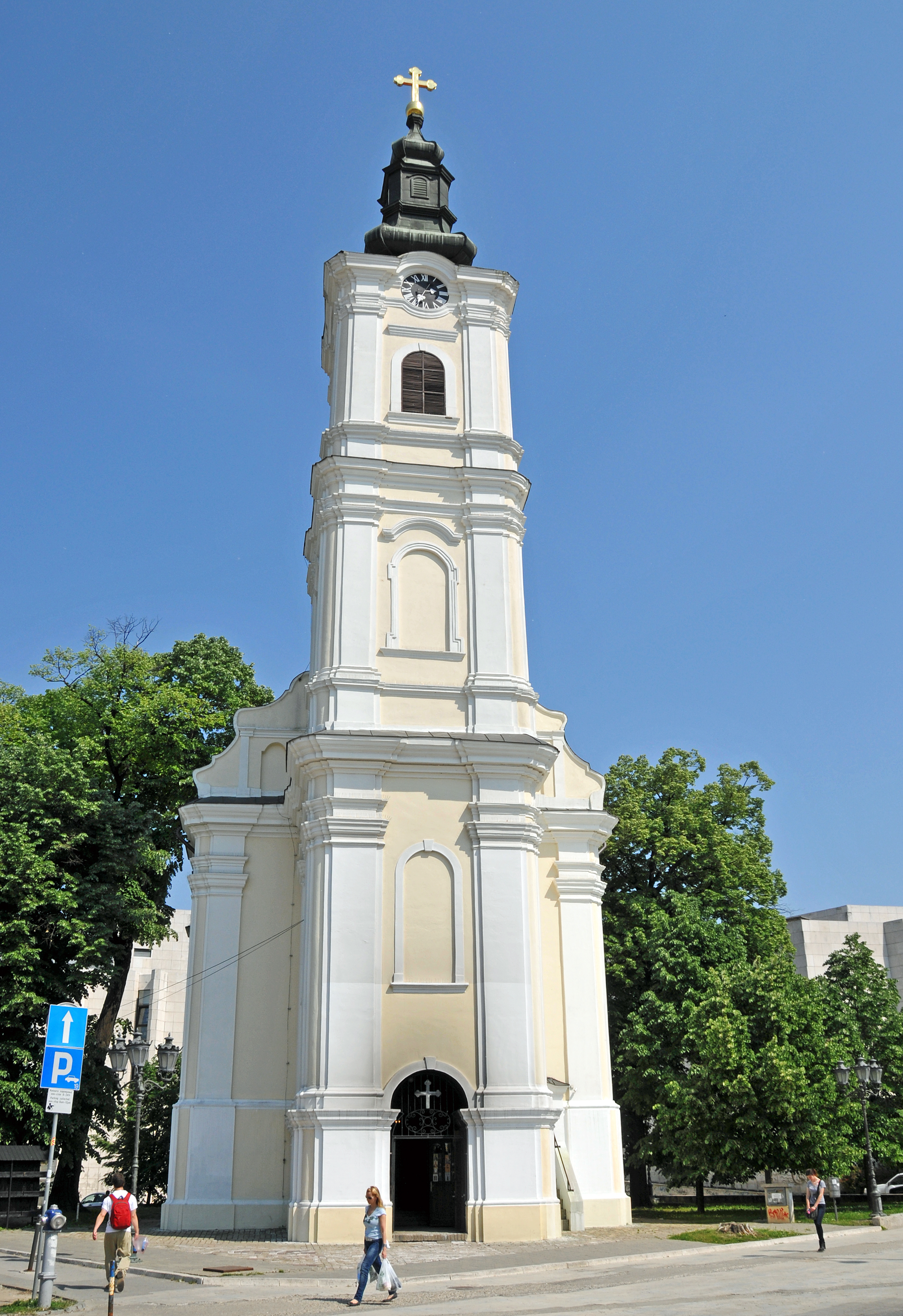
Uspenska Orthodox church in Stari Grad

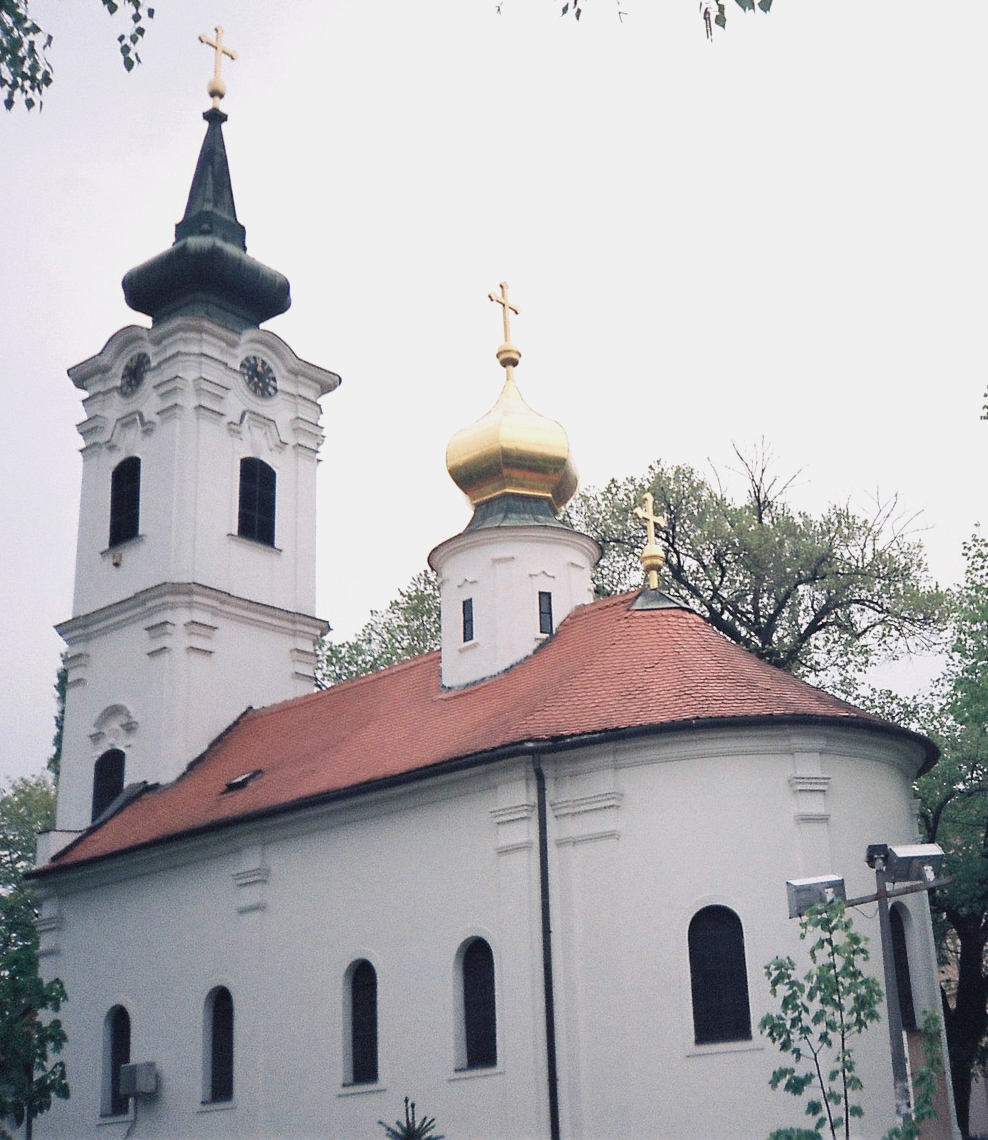
Nikolajevska Orthodox church in Stari Grad

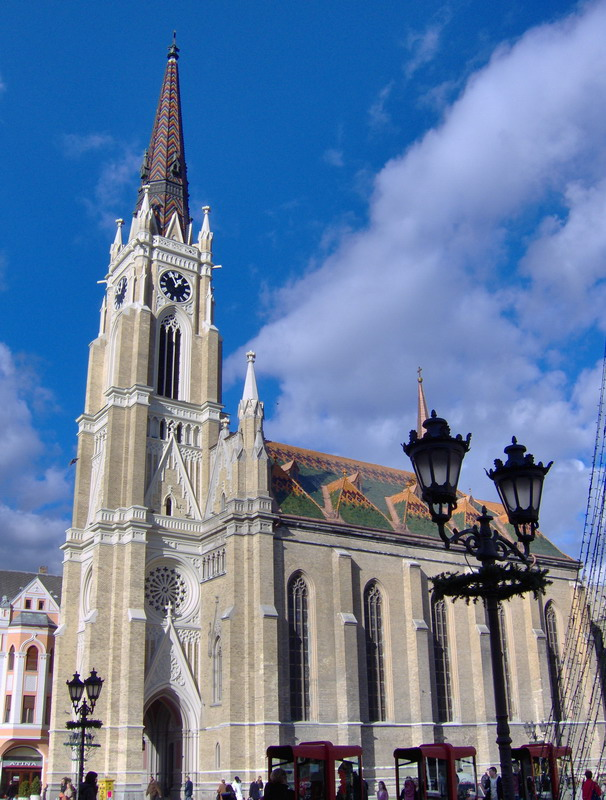
The Name of Mary (Latin) Catholic church in Stari Grad

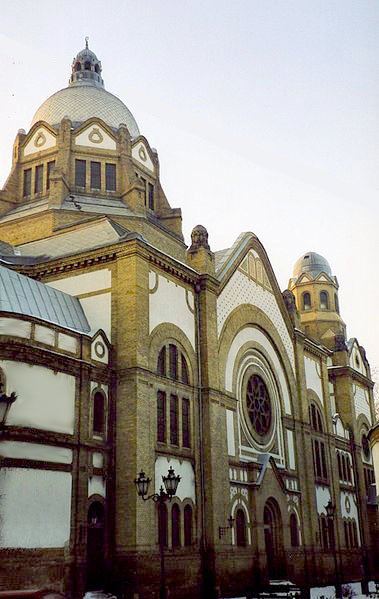
Synagogue in Stari grad

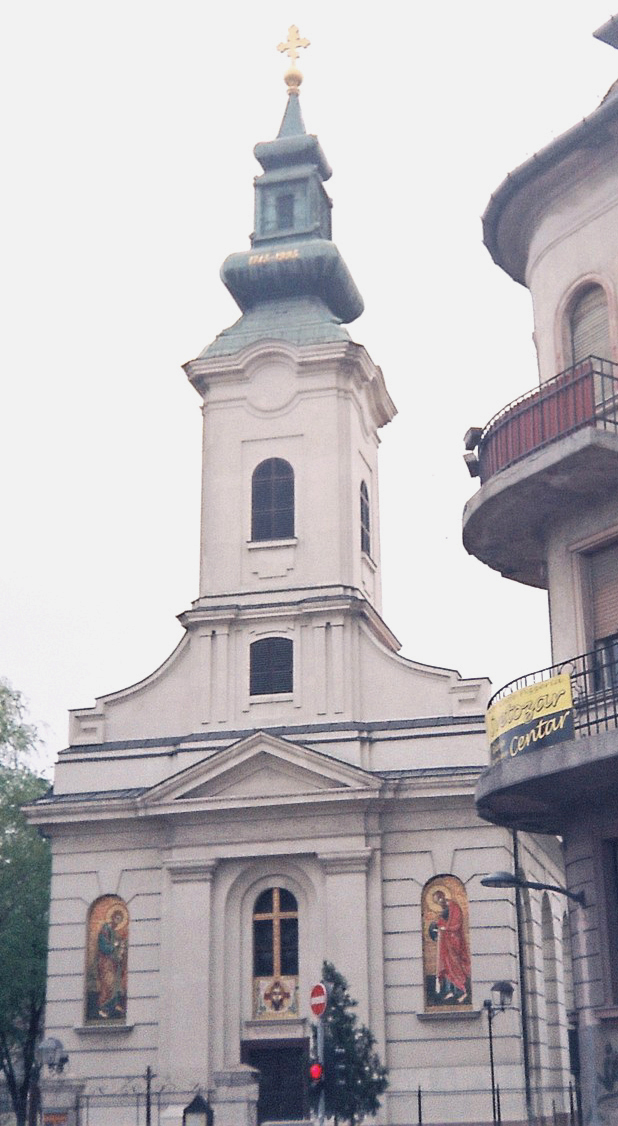
Greek Catholic (Rusyn) church in Stari grad

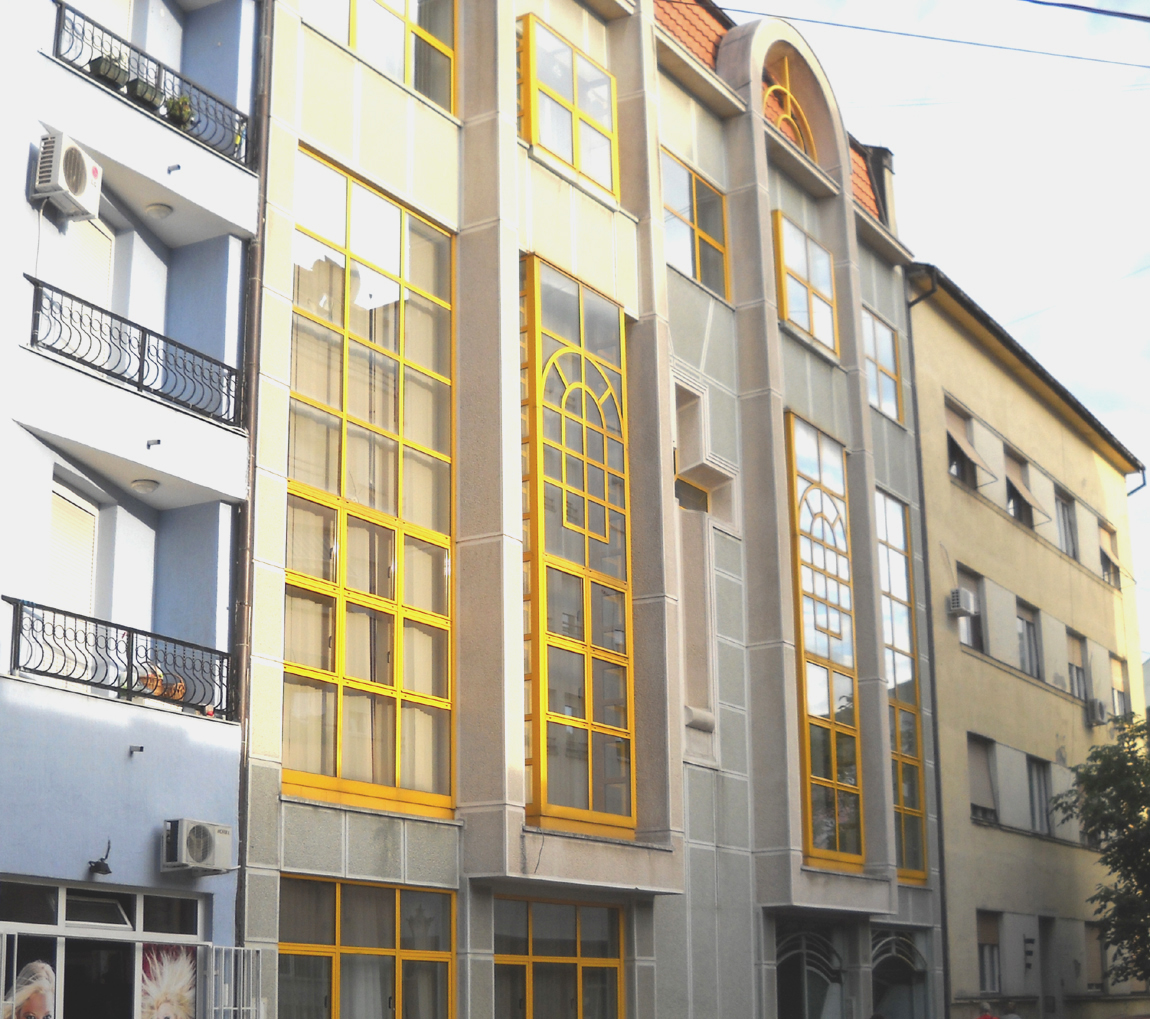
Adventist Protestant church in Stari grad

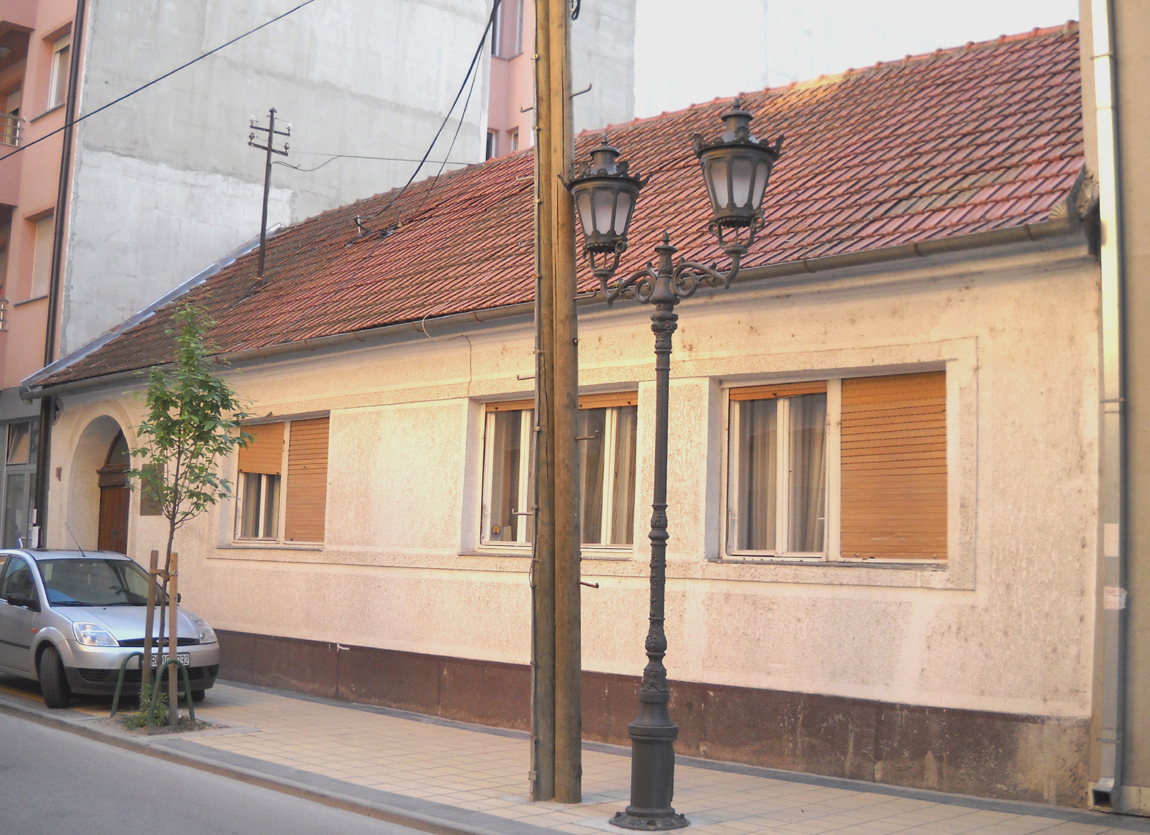
Adventist Protestant prayer house in Stari grad

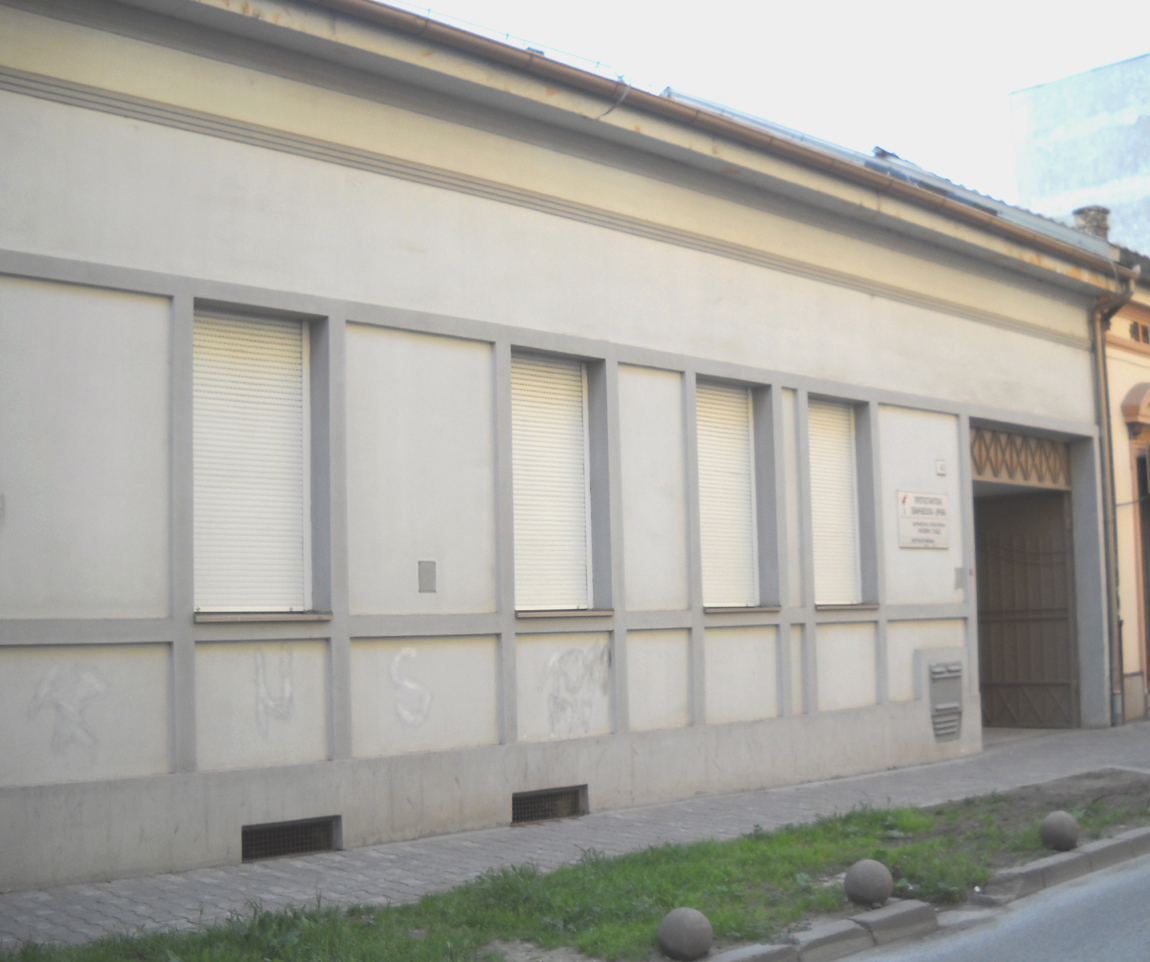
Evangelical Protestant church in Stari grad

== Society ==
=== Institutions ===
Important institutions located in Stari grad: Parliament of the Autonomous Province of Vojvodina, Government of the Autonomous Province of Vojvodina, Matica Srpska, Library of Matica Srpska, Gallery of Matica Srpska, Serbian National Theatre, The Theatre of Young, Museum of Vojvodina, Archive of Vojvodina, Novi Sad Open University, Offset of the Serbian Academy of Science and Art, Vojvodina Academy of Sciences and Arts, People's Library, Cultural Centre of Novi Sad, Novi Sad Television, Novi Sad Radio.

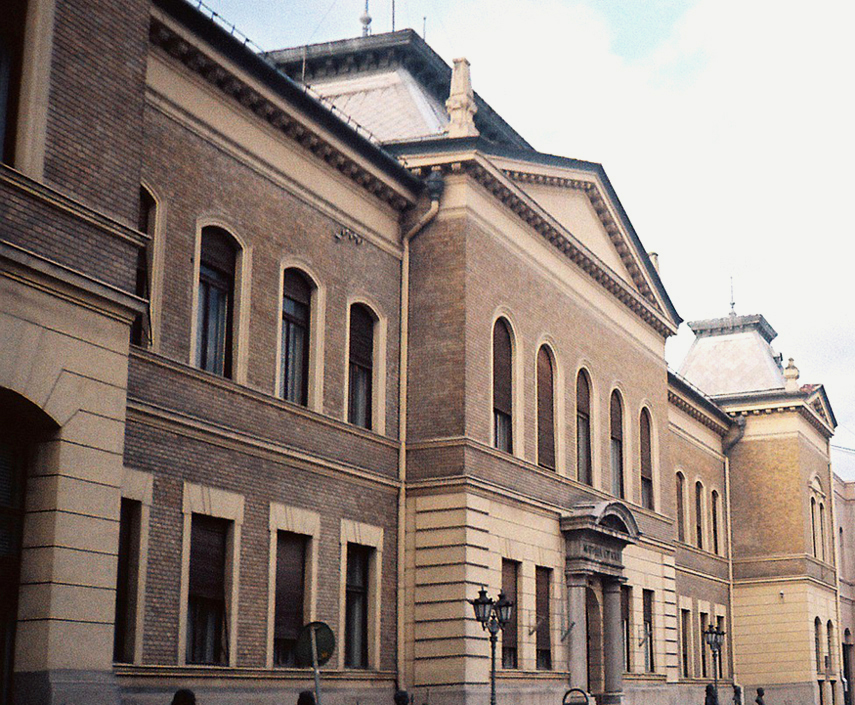
Matica srpska

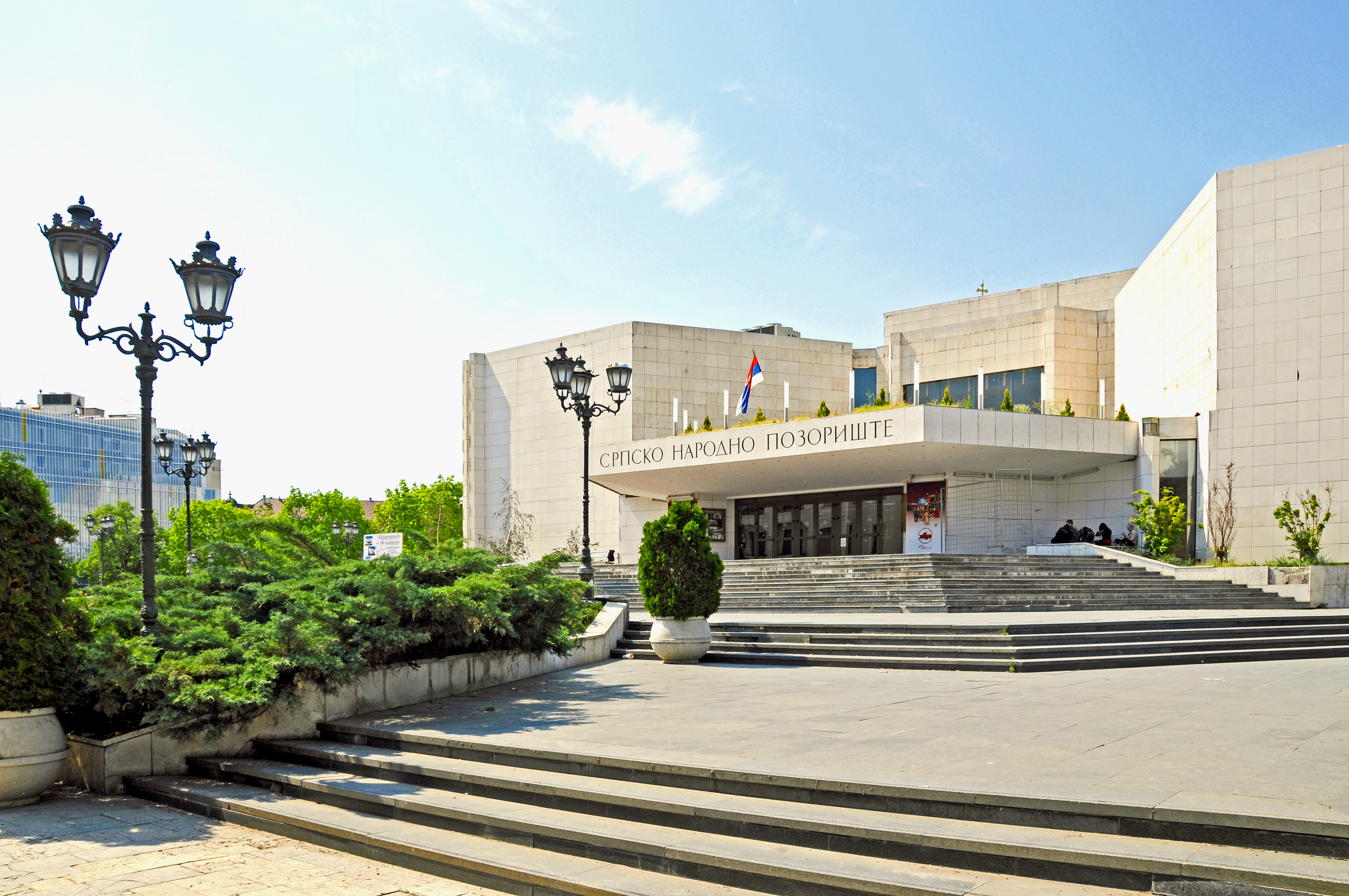
The Serbian National Theatre

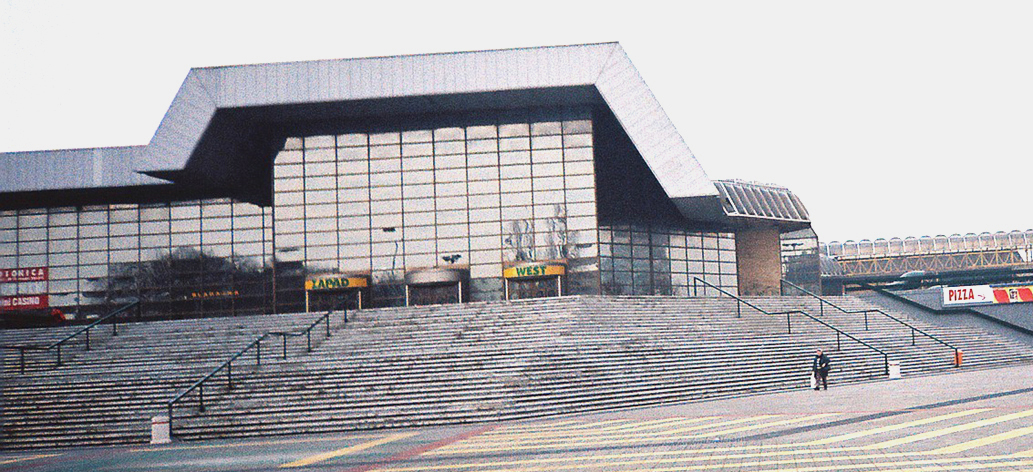
Spens Sports Center

== See also ==
- Neighborhoods of Novi Sad
- History of Novi Sad
- Podbara
- Rotkvarija
- Grbavica
- Liman
- Petrovaradin
- Petrovaradin Fortress
