= Salajka =

Salajka Салајка
- Urban neighborhood
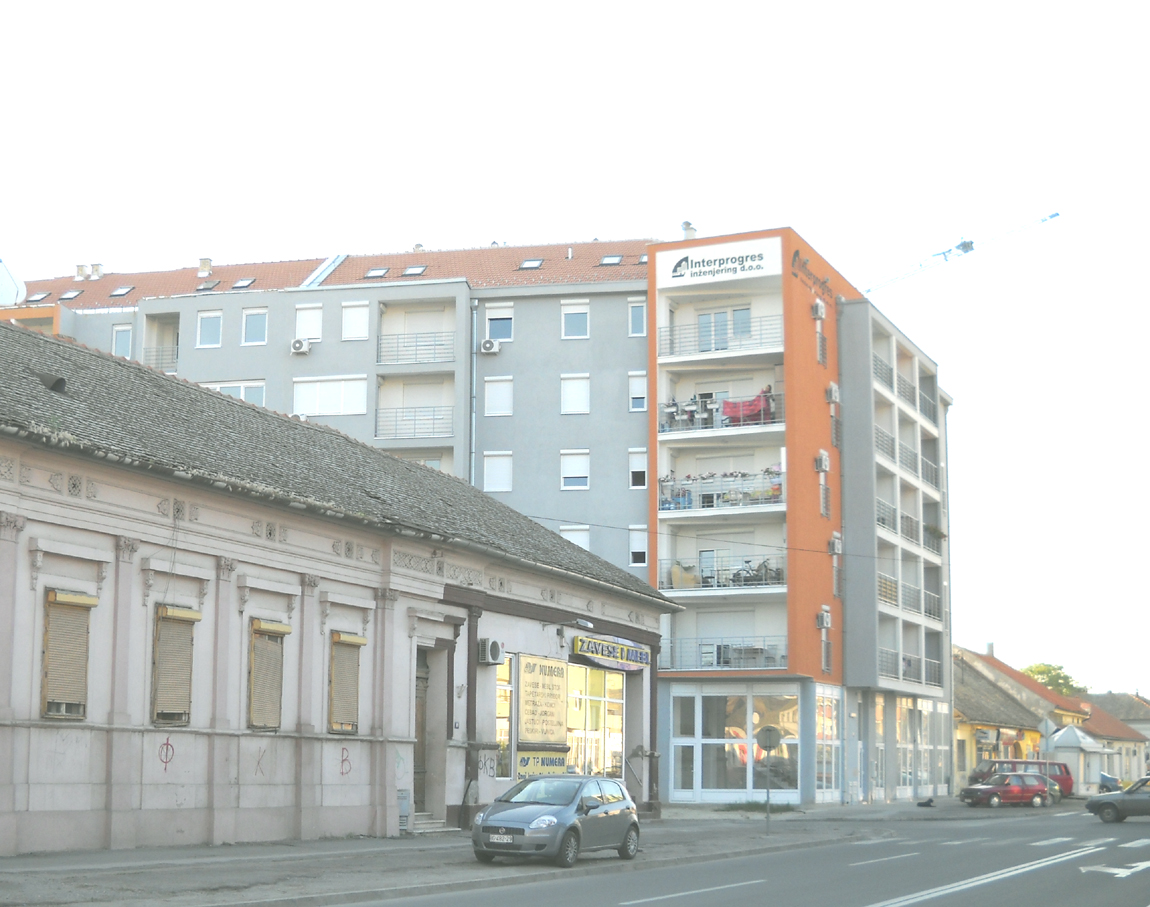
- Salajka, Temerinska street
- Interactive map of Salajka
- Country: Serbia
- Province: Vojvodina
- District: South Bačka
- Municipality: Novi Sad

Area
  - Total: 12.05 km^{2} (4.65 sq mi)
- Time zone: UTC+1 (CET)
  - Summer (DST): UTC+2 (CEST)
- Area code: +381(0)21
- Car plates: NS

Salajka (Serbian: Салајка), also known as Slavija (Serbian: Славија), is an urban neighborhood of the city of Novi Sad, Serbia.

== Borders ==
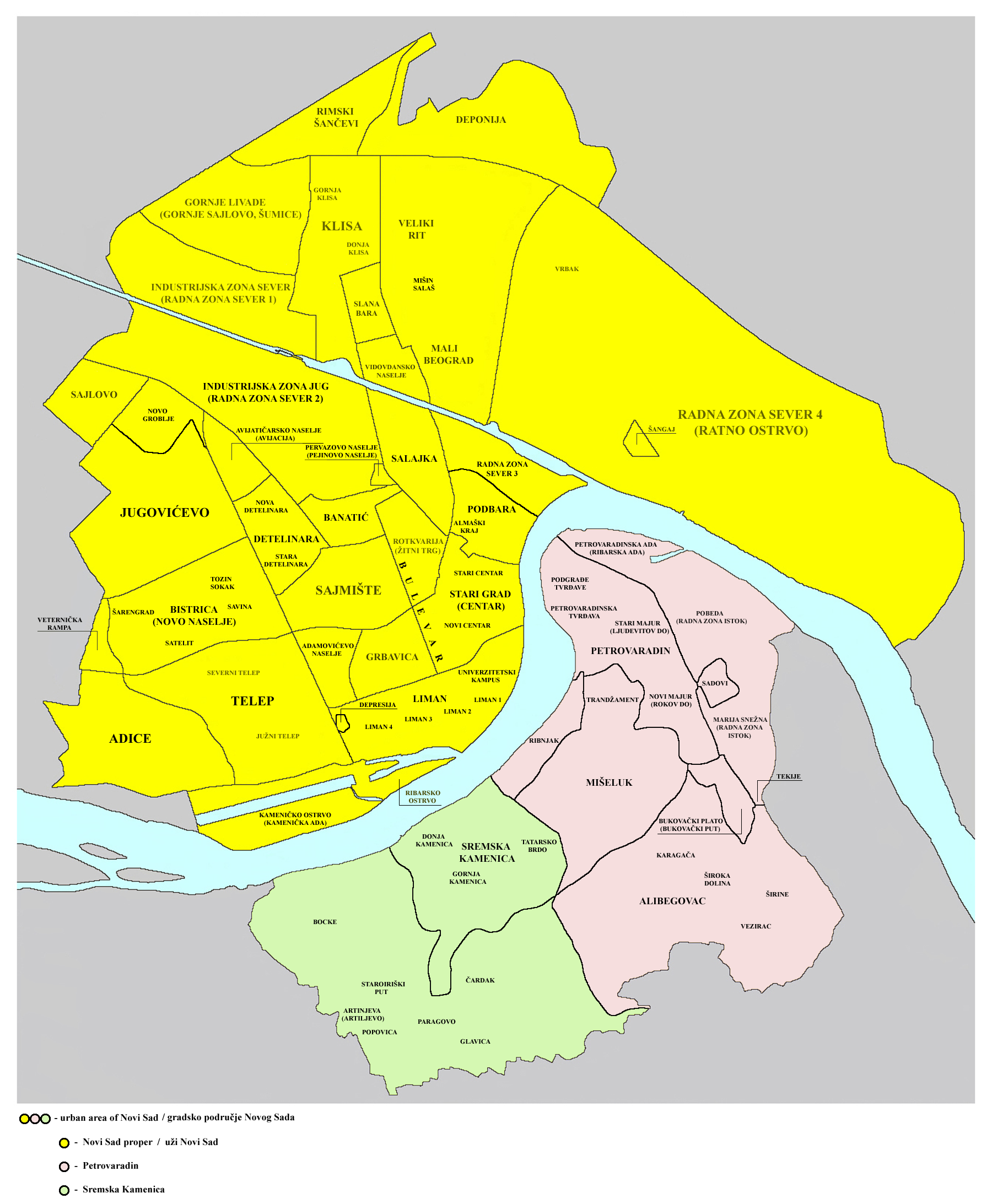
Map of the urban area of Novi Sad with city quarters, showing the location of Salajka

The western and southern border of Salajka is Kisačka ulica (Kisač Street), the eastern border is Temerinska ulica (Temerin Street), and the northern border is Danube-Tisa-Danube channel.

== Neighbouring city quarters ==
The neighbouring city quarters are: Podbara in the east, Stari Grad in the south, Rotkvarija in the south-west, Banatić, Pervazovo Naselje and Industrijska Zona Jug in the west, and Vidovdansko Naselje in the north, across the channel.

== History ==
Between 1980 and 1989, the seat of the Slavija municipality, one of the former seven municipalities of Novi Sad City, was located in Salajka.

== Sport ==
The play ground of the football club "Slavija" is located in Salajka.

== Gallery ==
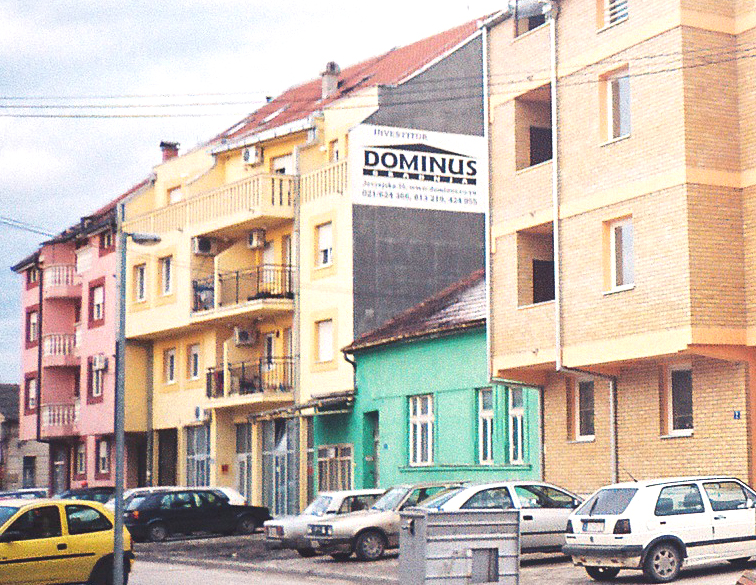
Salajka, Karađorđeva street

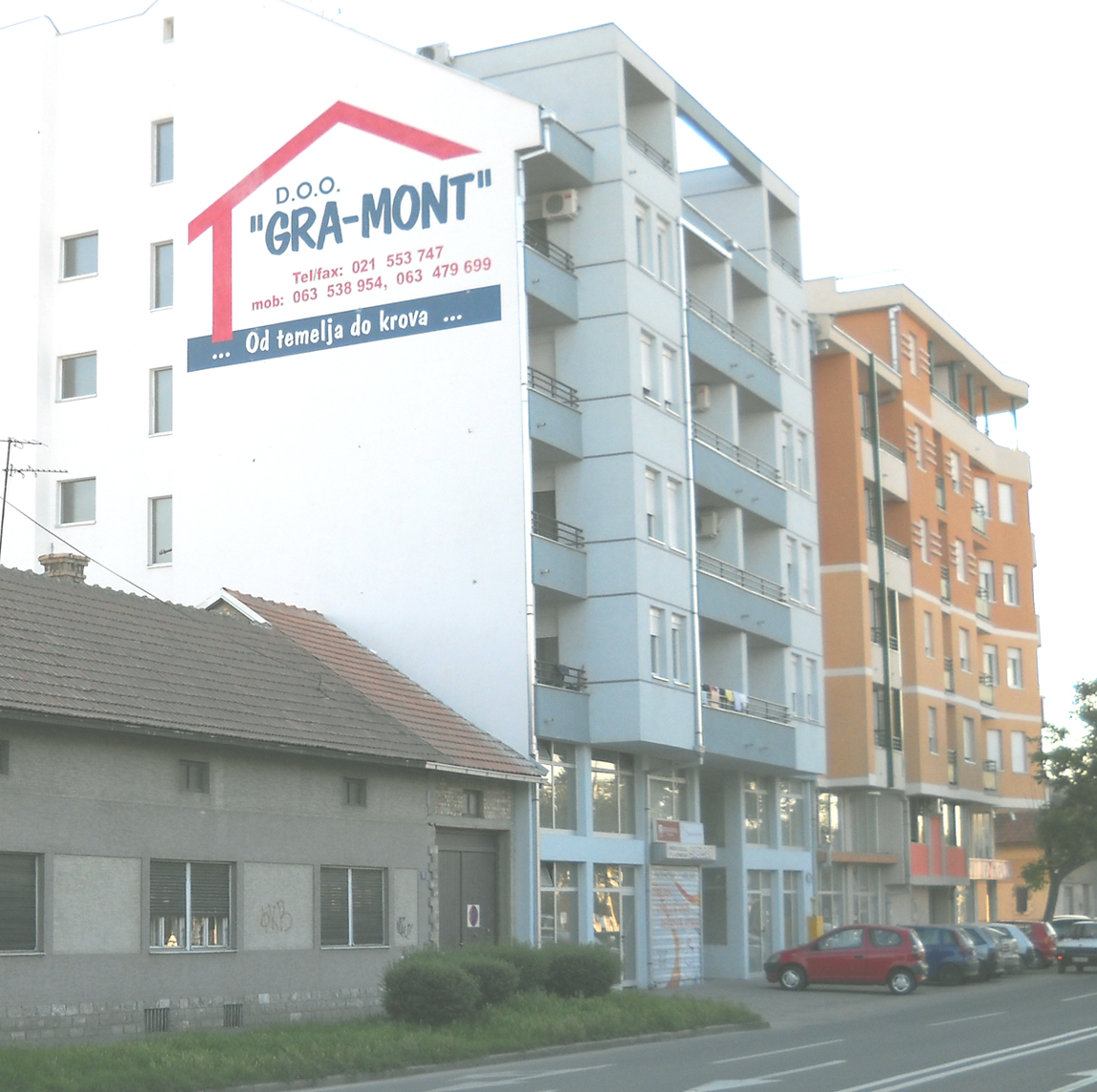
Salajka, Temerinska street

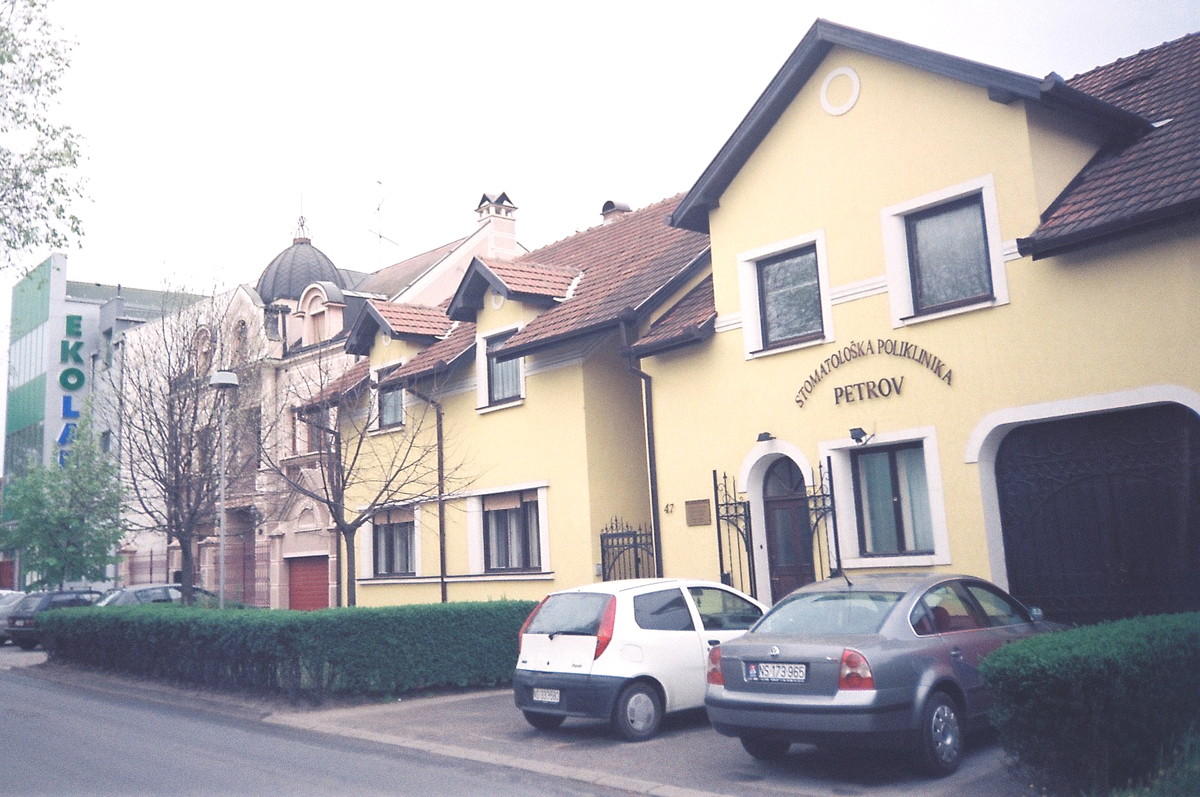
Salajka, Jovana Cvijića street

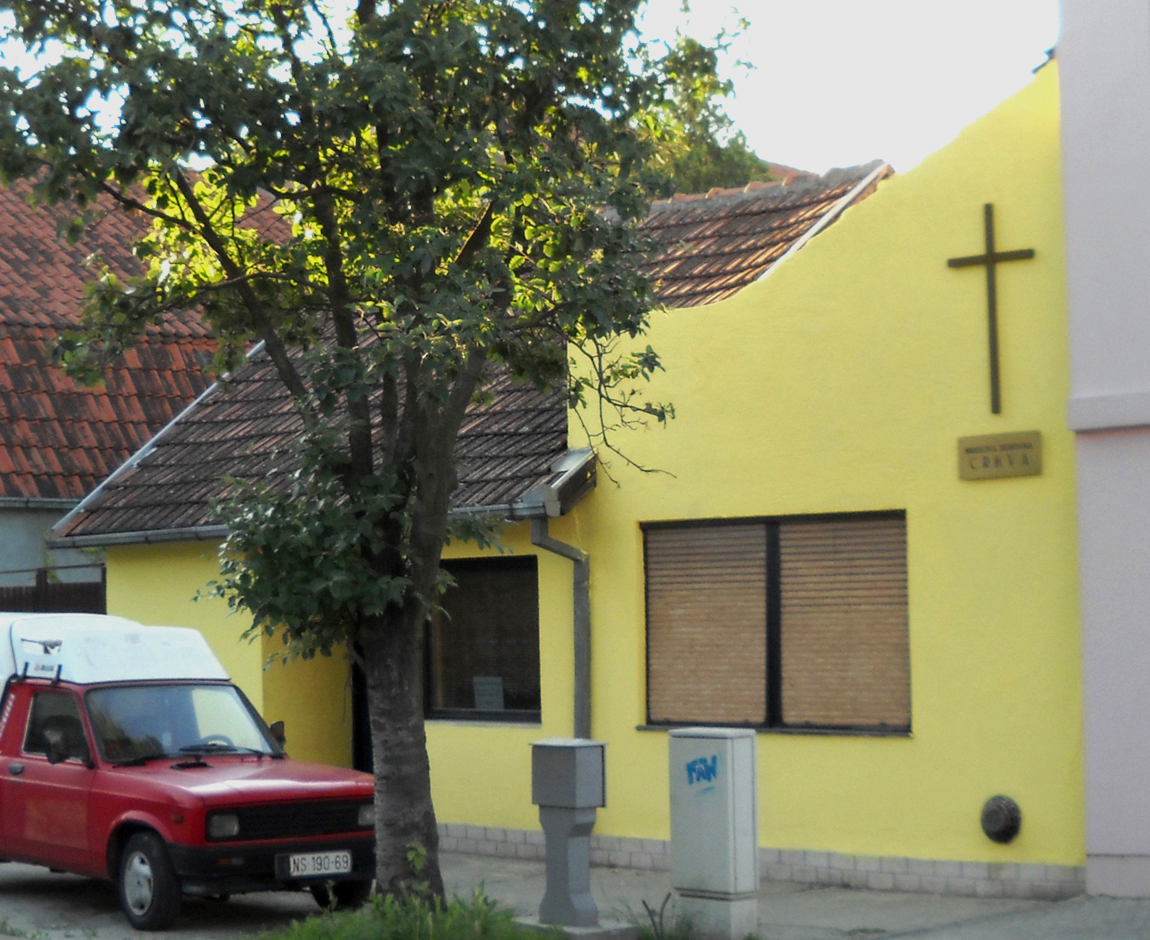
Spiritual Church of Christ in Salajka

== See also ==
- Neighborhoods of Novi Sad
