= History of Novi Sad =

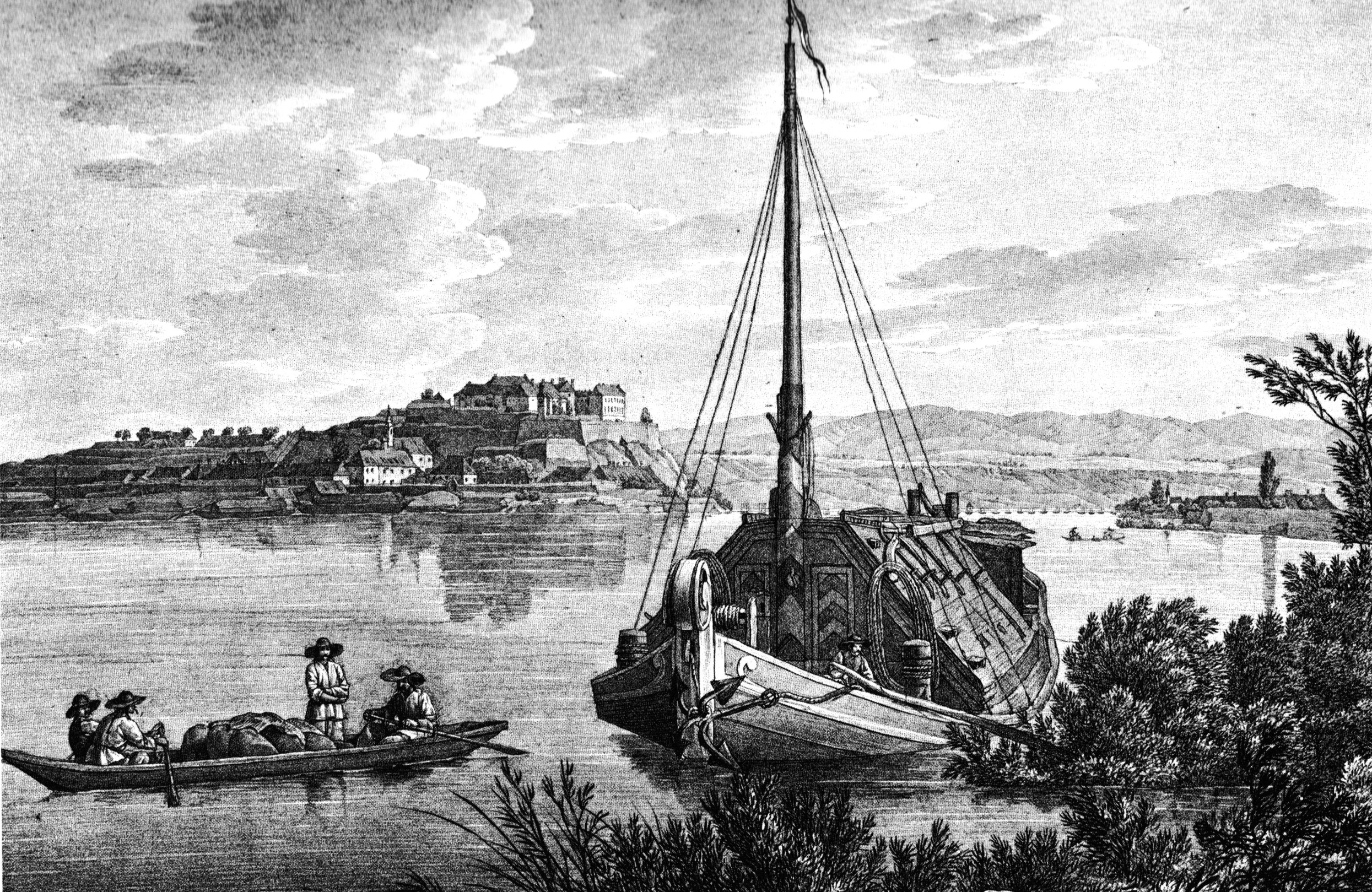
Petrovaradin and Novi Sad in 1821

Novi Sad is the second largest city of Serbia. It began as a Stone Age settlement in present-day Petrovaradin. The Celts founded the first fortress at this location. During Roman rule, a larger fortress was built in the 1st century AD. It was devastated by the Huns in the 5th century and rebuilt by the Byzantines. The city passed through many other hands until being conquered by the Kingdom of Hungary. The city was first mentioned under the name Peturwarad or Petrovaradin in documents from 1237. It passed through the Ottoman Empire in the 16th century and the Habsburg monarchy in the 17th.

During Habsburg rule, people of Orthodox faith were forbidden from residing in Petrovaradin. Because of this, a new settlement was founded in 1698 on the left bank of the Danube. The initial name of this settlement was Ratzen Stadt (Serbian: Raski Grad, meaning "the Serb City" in English). The settlement officially gained the present name Novi Sad (Neoplanta in Latin) in 1748 when it became a "free royal city". In 1780, Novi Sad had about 2,000 houses, of which 1,144 were Serbian. For much of the 18th and 19th centuries, Novi Sad was the largest city populated with ethnic Serbs in the world. After 1867, Novi Sad was located within the Hungarian part of Austria-Hungary. During this time, the Magyarization policy of the Hungarian government drastically altered the demographic structure of the city, dramatically increasing the number of Hungarian language speakers.

In 1941, the Kingdom of Yugoslavia was invaded and partitioned by the Axis powers, and Novi Sad was annexed by Hungary. During World War II, about 5,000 citizens were murdered and many others were resettled. Since 1945, Novi Sad has been the capital of Vojvodina, a province of the Socialist Federal Republic of Yugoslavia. After 1992, Novi Sad was part of the Federal Republic of Yugoslavia, which, in 2003, was transformed into the State Union of Serbia and Montenegro. Devastated by NATO bombardment during the Kosovo War, it was left without all of its three Danube bridges, communications, water, and electricity. Its oil refinery was bombarded daily, causing widespread ecological damage. Novi Sad is now part of an independent Serbia.

== Early history of Petrovaradin ==
Human settlement in the territory of present-day Novi Sad has been traced as far back as the Stone Age (about 4500 BC). This settlement was located on the right bank of the river Danube in the territory of present-day Petrovaradin.

This region was conquered by Celts (in the 4th century BC) and Romans (in the 1st century BC). The Celts founded the first fortress at this location, which was located on the right bank of the Danube. During Roman rule, a larger fortress was built in the 1st century AD with the name Cusum and was included into Roman province Pannonia. In the 5th century, Cusum was devastated by the invasion of the Huns.

By the end of the 5th century, Byzantines had reconstructed the city and called it by the names Cusum and Petrikon. The city in time became conquered by the Ostrogoths, Gepids, Avars, Franks, Bulgarians, and again by the Byzantines.

The city was ruled by the Kingdom of Hungary until the 16th century; by the Ottoman Empire (in 1526), and by the Habsburg monarchy (in 1687). The city was first mentioned under the name Peturwarad (Pétervárad, Serbian: Petrovaradin) in documents from 1237. Another name used for it was Bélakút. Petrovaradin was known under the name Pétervárad under Hungarian rule, Varadin under Ottoman rule, and Peterwardein under Habsburg rule.

During the Ottoman rule, Petrovaradin had 200 houses, and three mosques. There was also a Christian quarter with 35 houses populated with ethnic Serbs.

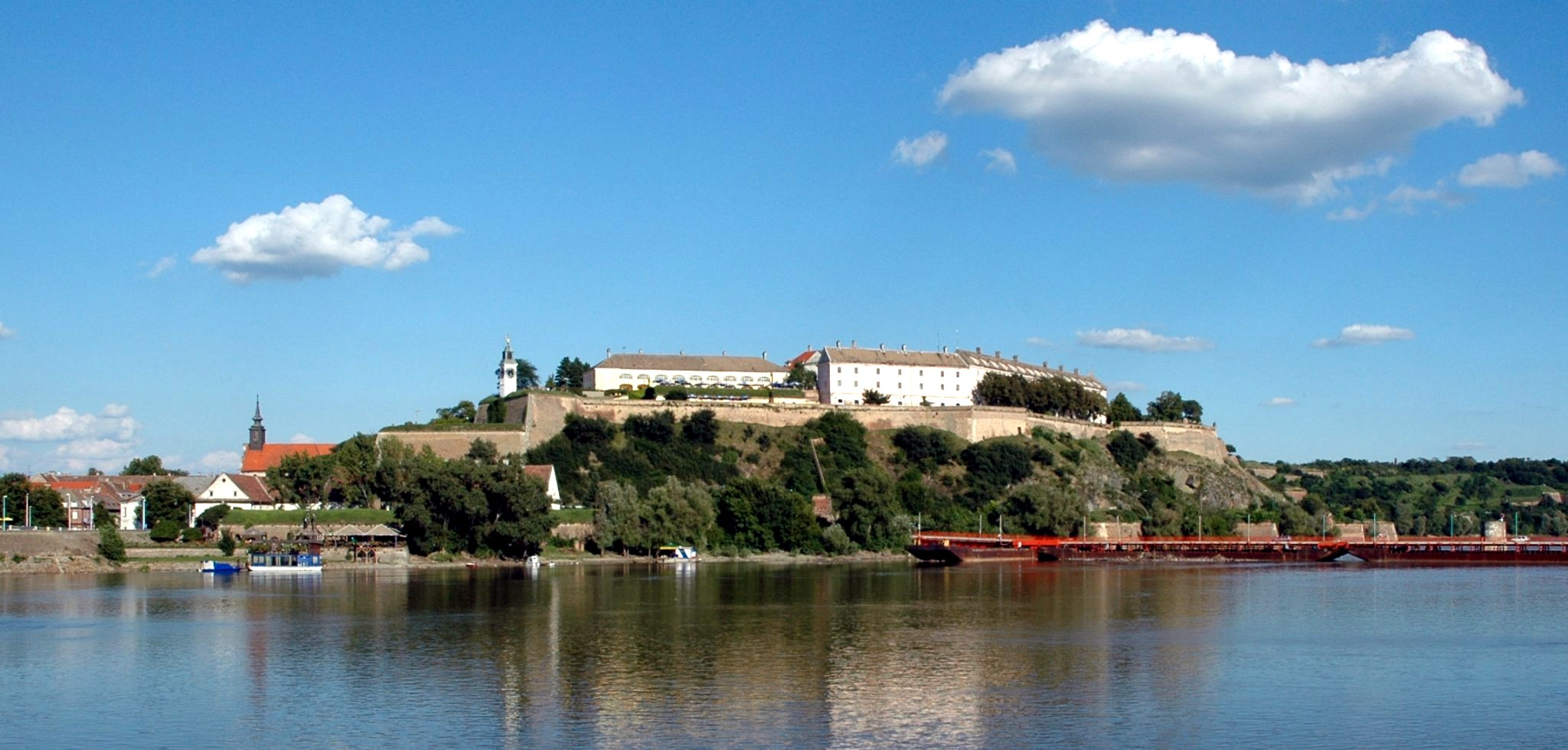
Petrovaradin fortress over the Danube

== Early history of Sremska Kamenica ==
Sremska Kamenica was first mentioned in historical documents in 1237. In this time the town was under administration of the Kingdom of Hungary, although its name has a Slavic origin, implying that it was initially inhabited by Slavs. The name of the town derives from the Slavic word "kamen" ("stone" in English) and was recorded as "villa Camanch" in 1237 and "Kamenez" in 1349.

Before the Ottoman conquest in the 16th century, the town had about 150 houses, while during the Ottoman rule, in 1567, the population of the town numbered only 15 houses. The inhabitants of the town during Ottoman rule were Serbs.

After the establishment of the Habsburg rule, the Habsburg census from 1702 recorded 40 houses in the town, almost all of them populated by ethnic Serbs. During the 18th century, the number of Orthodox inhabitants increased to 1,000. During the Habsburg rule, the town was a possession of the Marcibányi and Karácsonyi families.

== Other older settlements ==
Before the foundation of Novi Sad (Ratzen Stadt) in 1694, several other settlements existed on the left bank of the river Danube in the territory of present-day Novi Sad (besides Petrovaradin and Sremska Kamenica on the right bank of the Danube). In 1237, several settlements were mentioned to exist at this location. Between the 13th and 16th century, the following settlements existed in the territory of modern urban area of Novi Sad:

- Baksa or Baksafalva (Serbian: Bakša or Bakšić) – this settlement was located in the area of modern neighborhood of Stari Grad.
- Kűszentmárton (Serbian: Sent Marton) – this settlement was located in the area of modern neighborhood of Telep.
- Bivalyos or Bivalo (Serbian: Bivaljoš or Bivalo) – this settlement was located in the area of modern neighborhood of Slana Bara.
- Vásárosvárad (Serbian: Vašaroš Varad or Varadinci) – this settlement was located in the periphery of modern neighborhood of Klisa.
- Zajol I (Serbian: Sajlovo I, Gornje Sajlovo or Gornja Isailova) – this settlement was located in the area of modern neighborhoods of Klisa and Gornje Livade.
- Zajol II (Serbian: Sajlovo II, Donje Sajlovo or Donje Isailovo) – this settlement was located in the area of modern neighborhood of Sajlovo.
- Bistritz (Serbian: Bistrica) – this settlement was (maybe) located in the area of modern neighborhood of Bistrica (Novo Naselje).

Some other settlements existed in the suburban area of Novi Sad:

- Mortályos (Serbian: Mrtvaljoš) – this settlement was located in the northern suburban area of Novi Sad.
- Csenei (Serbian: Čenej) – this settlement was located in the area of modern village of Čenej.
- Keménd (Serbian: Kamendin) – this settlement was located in the area of modern Kamendin, which is part of the village of Sirig.
- Rév (Serbian: Rivica) – this settlement was located in the northern suburban area of Novi Sad.

Etymology of the settlement names show that some of them are of Slavic origin, which indicate that some of them were initially inhabited by Slavs. For example, Bivalo (Bivaljoš) was a large Slavic settlement that dates from the 5th–6th century. Some settlement names are of Hungarian origin (for example Kűszentmárton, Vásárosvárad, Rév), which indicate that these settlements were inhabited by Hungarians before the Ottoman invasion. Names of some settlements are of uncertain origin, or it is not clear whether their names are of Slavic or of Hungarian origin.

Tax records from 1522 are showing a mix of Hungarian and Slavic names among inhabitants of these villages, including Slavic names like Bozso (Božo), Radovan, Radonya (Radonja), Ivo, etc. Following the Ottoman invasion in the 16th–17th century, some of these settlements were destroyed and most Hungarian inhabitants have left this area. Some of the settlements also existed during the Ottoman rule, and were populated by ethnic Serbs.

In the year 1590, population of all villages that existed in the territory of present-day Novi Sad numbered 105 houses inhabited exclusively by Serbs. However, Ottoman records mention only those inhabitants that paid taxes, thus the number of Serbs that lived in the area (for example those that served in the Ottoman army) was larger.

== The foundation of Novi Sad ==
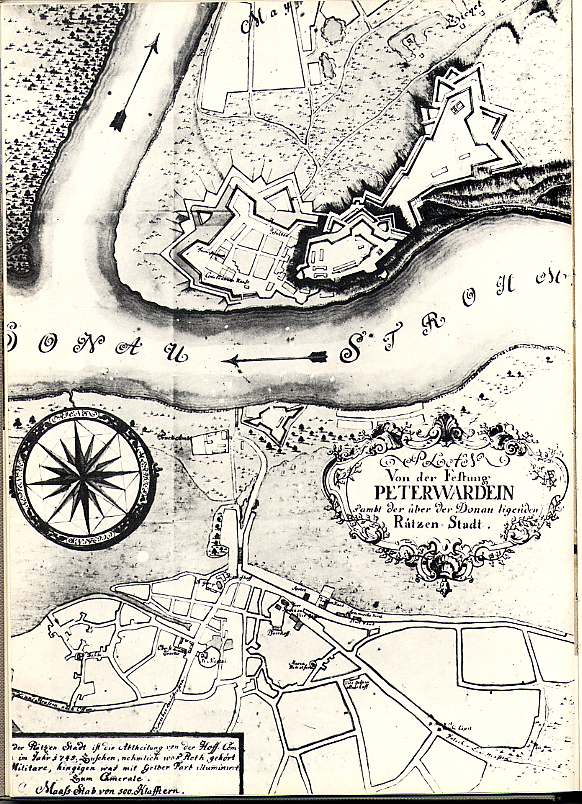
Map of Novi Sad (Ratzen Stadt) from 1745

At the outset of the Habsburg rule, people of Orthodox faith were forbidden from residing in Petrovaradin, thus Serbs were largely unable to build homes in the town. Because of this, a new settlement was founded in 1694 on the left bank of the Danube. The initial name of this settlement was Ratzen Stadt (Serbian: Racki Grad, meaning "the Serb City" in English). Another name used for the settlement was Peterwardein Schantz (Serbian: Petrovaradinski Šanac). In 1718, the inhabitants of the village of Almaš were resettled to Petrovaradinski Šanac, where they founded Almaški Kraj ("the Almaš quarter").

According to 1720 data, the population of Ratzen Stadt was composed of 112 Serbian, 14 German, and 5 Hungarian houses. According to 1720 data, the population of Ratzen Stadt was composed of 112 Serbian, 14 German, and 5 Hungarian houses. In 1746, Empress Maria Theresa handed the settlement of Petrovaradinski Šanac over to Bács-Bodrog County. Soon after the residence have requested of the Empress for the settlement to become a 'free royal city' of the Kingdom of Hungary. This request went through after the residents paid an amount of 80,000 forints to the royal treasury. The existing name at the time was not representable, so the residence proposed the new names of Bačvar (Serbian: Bački Grad), Dunavar (Serbian: Dunavgrad), Vizkoz (Serbian: Međurečje) or Vaserbrug (Serbian: Vodengrad) in German. The Royal Chancellery in Buda offered the names of Dunavar, Vizkoz and Ujvidek for the empress to pick from. Finally, the Empress, without any external suggestions, chose the present names of Neoplanta in Latin, Novi Sad in Serbian, Újvidék in Hungarian and Neustaz in German in 1748 when it became a 'free royal city'.

The edict that made Novi Sad a "free royal city" was proclaimed on February 1, 1748. The edict said: "We, Maria Theresa, by the God's mercy Holy Roman Empress, Queen of Hungary, Bohemia, Moravia, Dalmatia, Croatia, Slavonia, Rama, Serbia, Galicia, Lodomeria, Carinthia, etc, etc. Cast this proclamation to anyone, who might concern...so that the famous Petrovaradinski Šanac, which lies on the other side of the Danube in Bačka province on Sajlovo land, by the might of our divine royal power and prestige...make this town a Free Royal City and to fortify, accept and sign it in as one of the free royal cities of our Kingdom of Hungary and other territories, by abolishing its previous name of Petrovaradinski Šanac, renaming it Neoplanta (Latin), Újvidék (Hungarian), Neu-Satz (German), Novi Sad (Serbian), Mlada Loza (Bulgarian)".

In 1780, Novi Sad had about 2,000 houses, of which 1,144 were Serbian.

== Development from 1748 to 1918 ==
For much of the 18th and 19th centuries, Novi Sad was the largest city populated with ethnic Serbs in the World (The reformer of the Serbian language, Vuk Stefanović Karadžić, wrote in 1817 that Novi Sad is the "largest Serb municipality in the world". In 1820 Novi Sad had 20,000 inhabitants, of whom about 2/3 were Serbs. Belgrade, the current largest city populated by Serbs, did not reached similar population before 1853). It was a cultural and political centre of Serbs, who did not have their own national state at the time. Because of its cultural and political influence, Novi Sad became known as the Serb Athens (Srpska Atina in Serbian). According to the 1843 data, Novi Sad had 17,332 inhabitants, of whom 9,675 were Orthodox Christians, 5,724 Catholics, 1,032 Protestants, 727 Jews, and 30 adherents of the Armenian church. The largest ethnic group in the city were Serbs, and the second largest were Germans.

During the Revolution of 1848–1849, Novi Sad was part of Serbian Vojvodina, a Serbian autonomous region within Habsburg Empire. In 1849 the Hungarian army located on the Petrovaradin Fortress bombarded and devastated the city, which lost much of its population (According to 1850 census there were only 7,182 citizens in the city compared with about 20,000 in 1820).

Between 1849 and 1860, the city was part of a separate Austrian crownland known as the Voivodeship of Serbia and Temes Banat. After the abolishment of this province, the city was included into Bacsensis-Bodrogiensis County. After 1867, Novi Sad was located within the Hungarian part of Austria-Hungary. During this time, the Magyarization policy of the Hungarian government drastically altered the demographic structure of the city, i.e. from the predominantly Serbian, the population of the city became ethnically mixed. According to 1880 census, the percent of Serbian language speakers in the city was 41.2%, and the percent of Hungarian language speakers was 25.9%. Until 1910, the percent of Serbian language speakers decreased to 34.52%, while the percent of Hungarian language speakers increased to 39.72%.

According to the 1910 census, the city had 33,590 inhabitants, of which 13,343 (39.72%) most frequently spoke Hungarian language, 11,594 (34.52%) Serbian language, 5,918 (17.62%) German language, 1,453 (4.33%) Slovak language, etc. It is not certain whether Hungarians or Serbs were largest ethnic group in the city in this time, since 1910 census is considered partially inaccurate by most historians because this census did not recorded the population by ethnic origin or mother tongue, but by the "most frequently spoken language", thus the census results overstated the number of Hungarian speakers, since this was official language at the time and many non-Hungarian native speakers stated that they most frequently speak Hungarian language in everyday communication. The city was also home to 2,326 Jews, of whom many were native Hungarian speakers. Another aspect of the census was that it not only recorded permanent residents of the city, but also temporary residents, who did not live in the city, but were situated there as part of the civil and military services.

== After the First World War ==
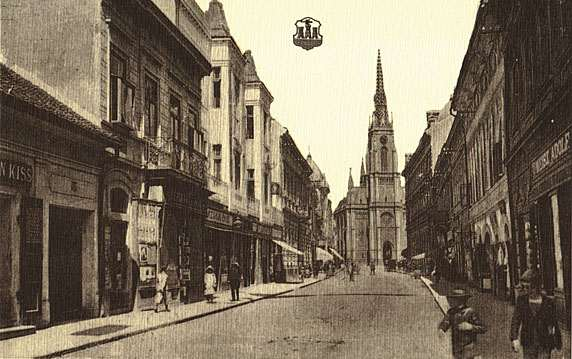
Novi Sad in 1920

On November 3, 1918, the Serb National Board and the Serb Safeguard were organized in the city. On November 6, the Serb National Board invited the Danube division of the Serbian army, which already entered Srem, to send its troops to Bačka as soon as possible. On November 8, the last Austro-Hungarian soldiers evacuated from the city, and the entire city was under control of the Serb National Board and the Serb Safeguard.

Serbian troops entered the city on November 9, 1918, and on November 25, 1918, the Assembly of Serbs, Bunjevci, and other nations of Vojvodina in Novi Sad proclaimed the unification of Vojvodina region with the Kingdom of Serbia (the assembly numbered 757 deputies, of which 578 were Serbs, 84 Bunjevci, 62 Slovaks, 21 Rusyns, 6 Germans, 3 Šokci, 2 Croats, and 1 Hungarian). Since December 1, 1918, Novi Sad is part of the Kingdom of Serbs, Croats, and Slovenes.

According to the 1921 census, the city had 39,122 inhabitants, of which 16,071 were Serbs, 13,065 Hungarians, 6,486 Germans, 2,663 Jews, 1,294 Slovaks, 672 Russians, 613 Slovenes. In 1929, Novi Sad became the capital of the Danube Banovina, a province of the Kingdom of Yugoslavia.

In 1941, the Kingdom of Yugoslavia was invaded and partitioned by the Axis powers, and its northern parts, including Novi Sad, were annexed by Hungary. During World War II, about 5,000 citizens were murdered and many others were resettled (in a 1942 raid alone, Hungarian gendarmerie killed 1,246 citizens, among them 809 Jews, 375 Serbs, 18 Hungarians, 15 Russians and 2 Rusyns, and threw their corpses into the icy waters of Danube). During the war, the resistance movement was active in the city. Citizens of all nationalities – Serbs, Hungarians, Slovaks and others fought together against the Axis authorities. On August 7, 1944, the Allies bombed the Novi Sad oil facilities as part of the Oil Campaign of World War II. The partisan forces from Srem and Bačka entered the city on October 23, 1944, and Novi Sad became part of the new socialist Yugoslavia. The post-war Yugoslav authorities punished those responsible for war crimes, as well as those that collaborated with the Axis authorities, although there are allegations that members of the partisan army also killed a certain number of innocent people, mainly for personal revenge.

Since 1945, Novi Sad has been the capital of Vojvodina, a province of the Socialist Republic of Serbia and Socialist Federal Republic of Yugoslavia. The city went through rapid industrialization and its population more than doubled in the period between World War II and the breakup of Yugoslavia.

After 1992, Novi Sad was part of the Federal Republic of Yugoslavia, which, in 2003, was transformed into the State Union of Serbia and Montenegro. Since 2006, Novi Sad is part of an independent Serbia.

Devastated by NATO bombardment during the Kosovo War of 1999, Novi Sad was left without all of its three Danube bridges, communications, water, and electricity. Residential areas were cluster bombed several times while its oil refinery was bombarded daily, causing severe pollution and widespread ecological damage.

== Gallery ==
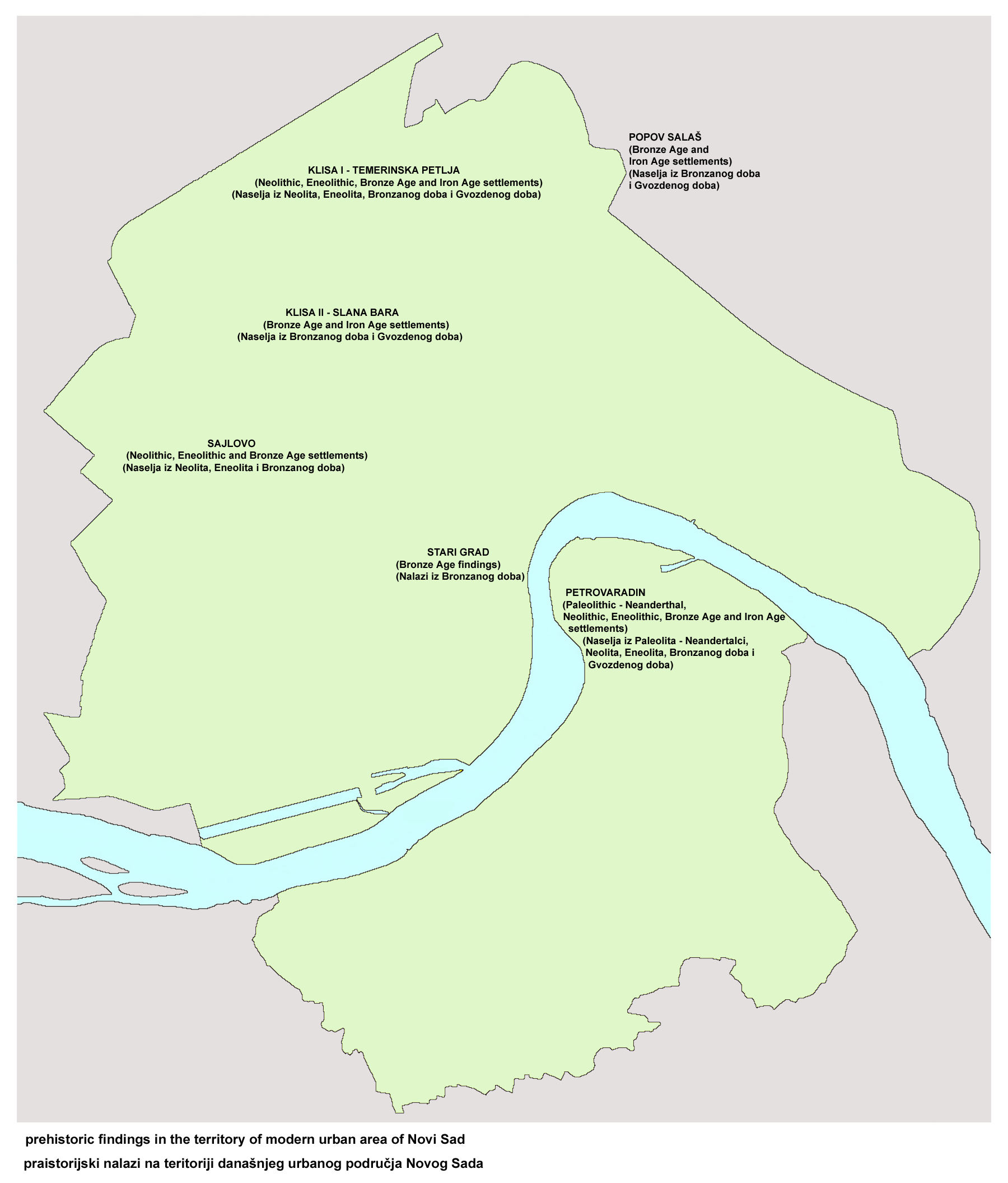
Prehistoric findings in the territory of modern urban area of Novi Sad

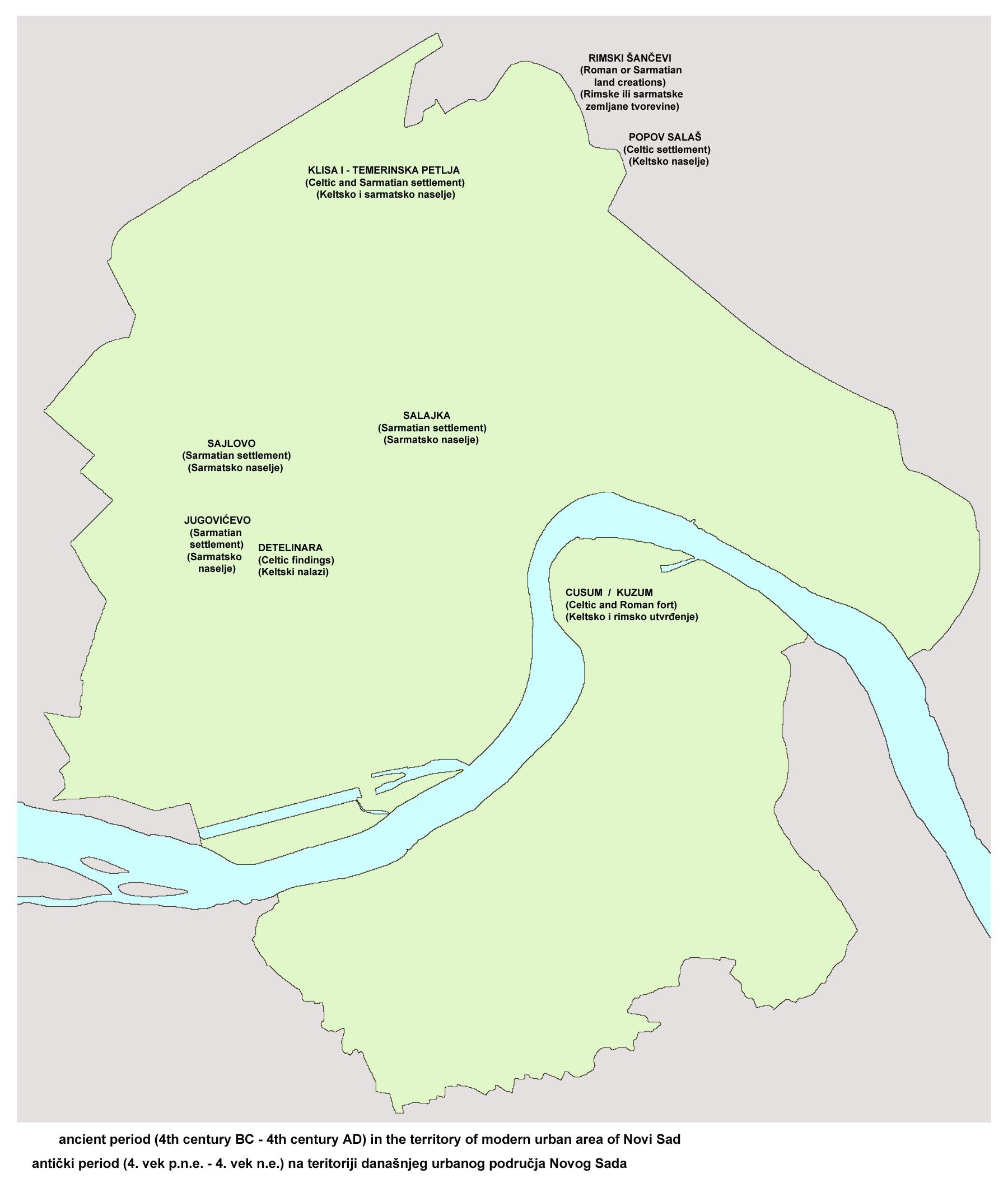
Ancient period (4th century BC - 4th century AD) in the territory of modern urban area of Novi Sad.

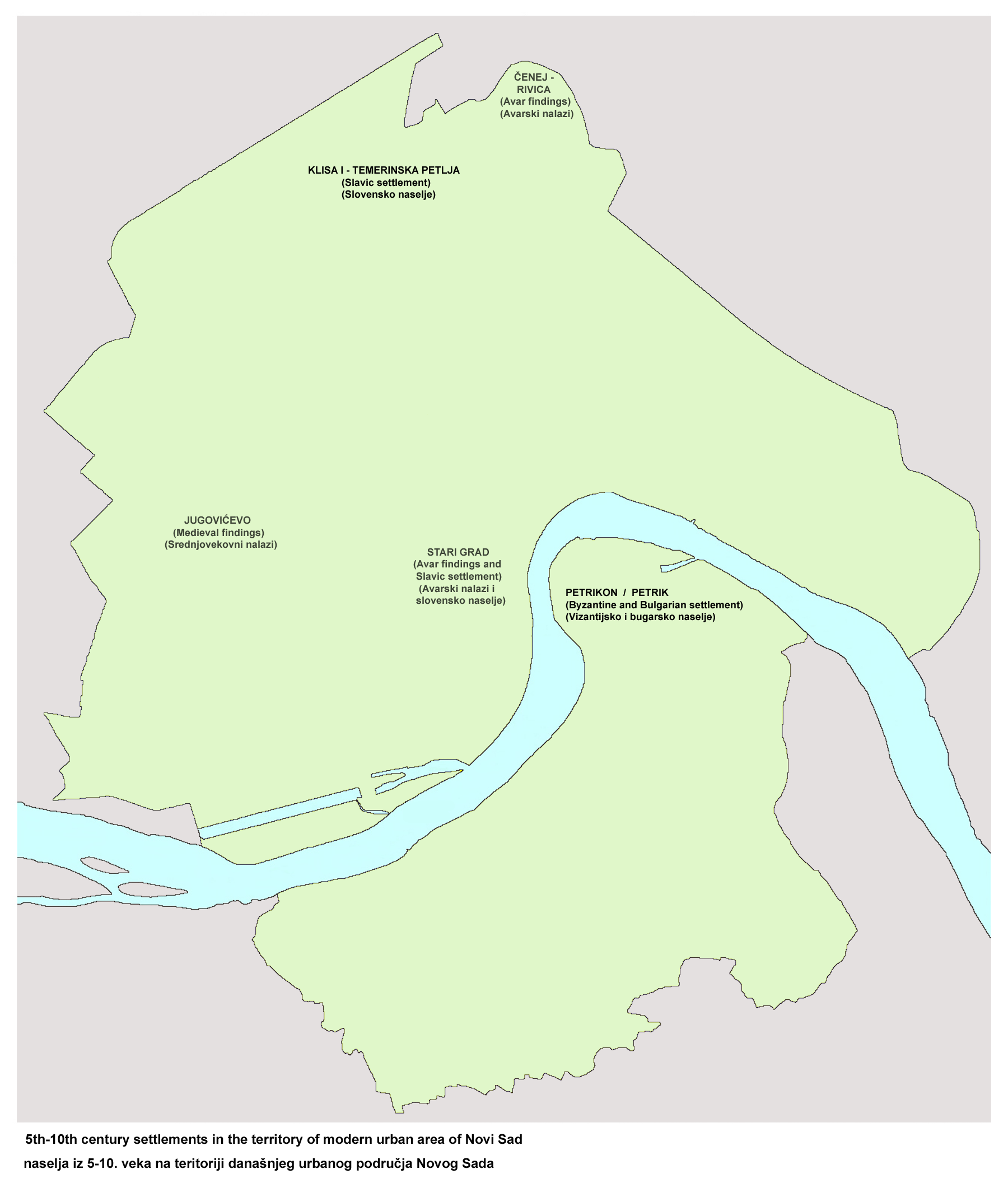
5th-10th century settlements in the territory of modern urban area of Novi Sad.

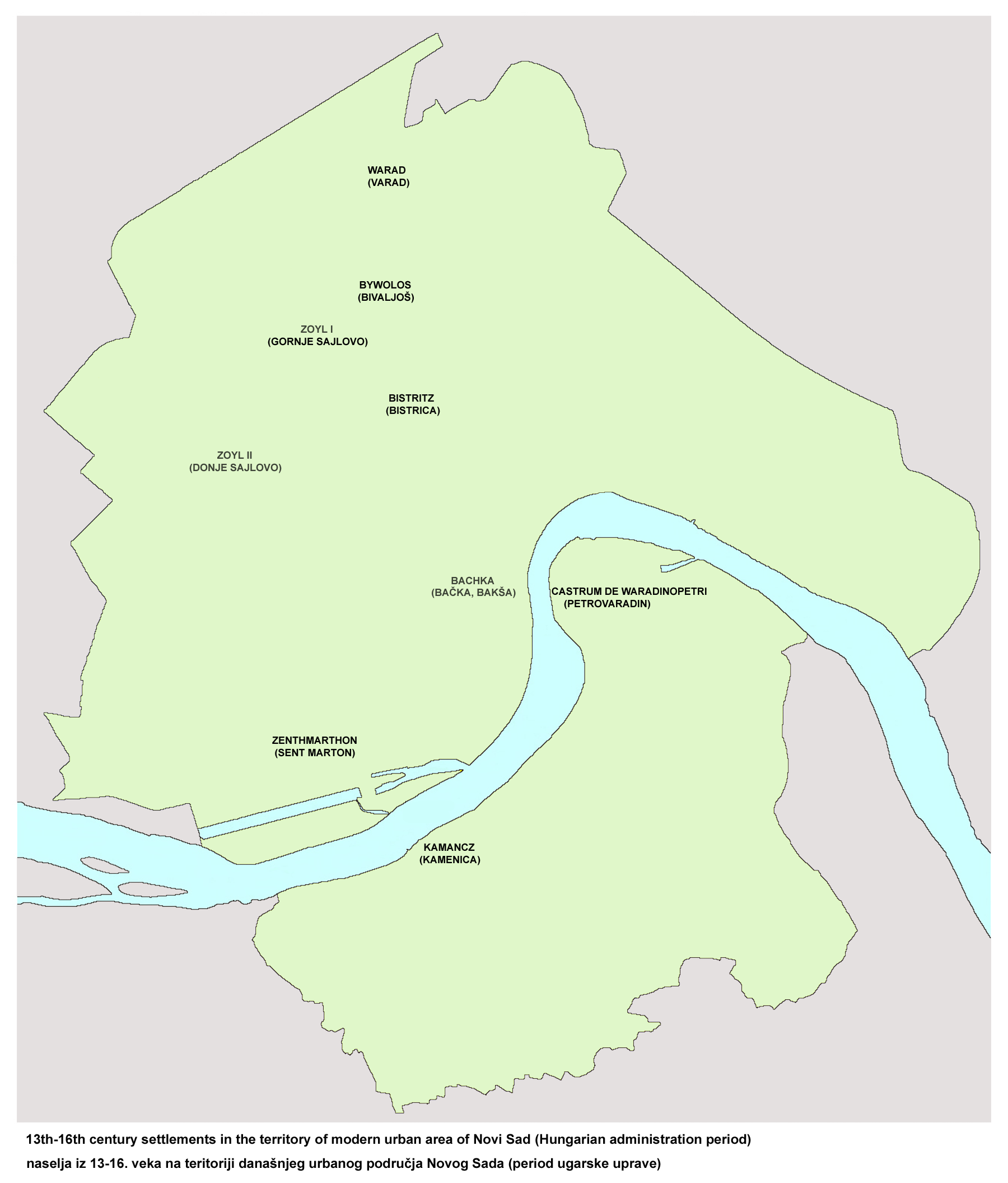
13th-16th century settlements in the territory of modern urban area of Novi Sad

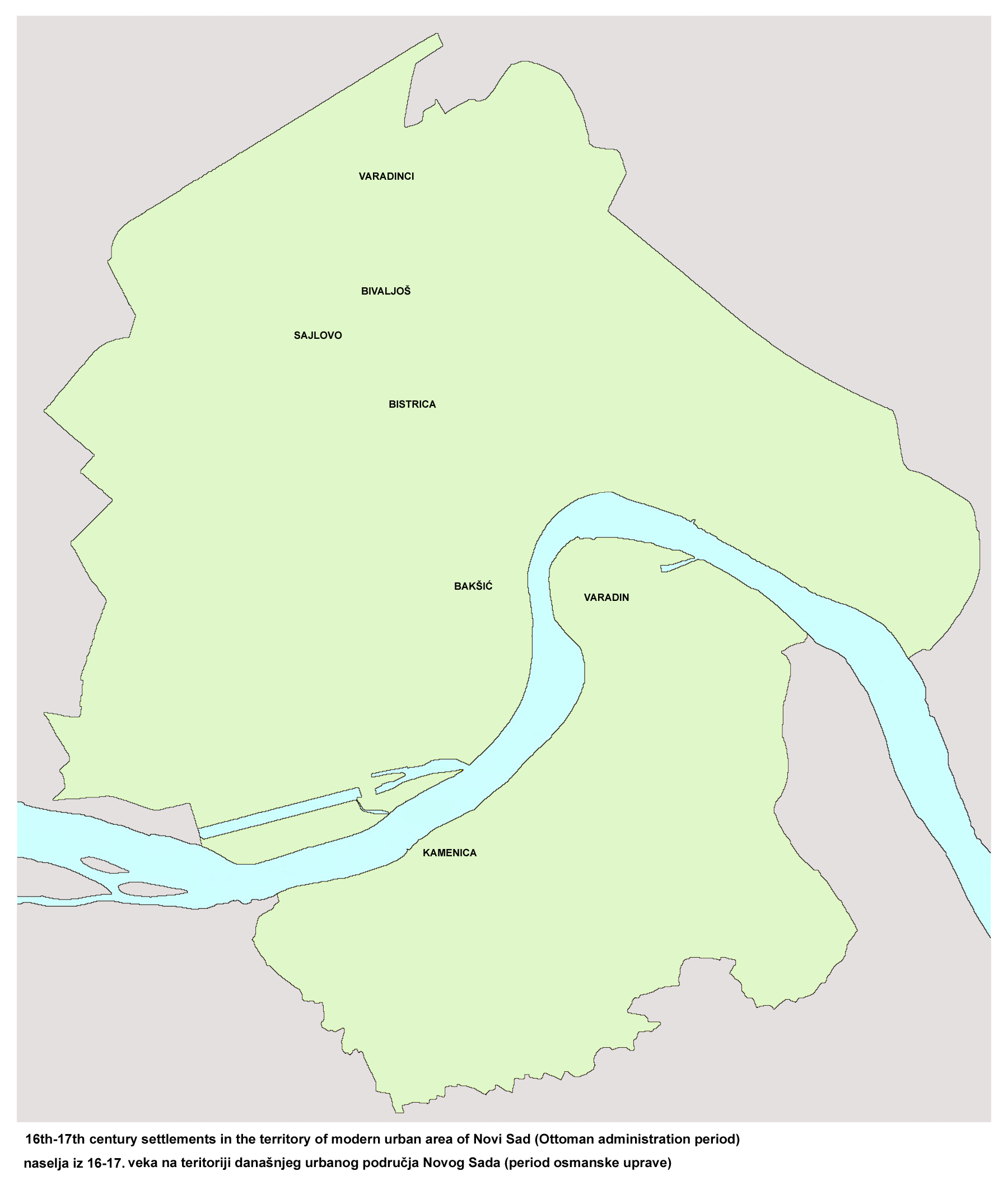
16th-17th century settlements in the territory of modern urban area of Novi Sad

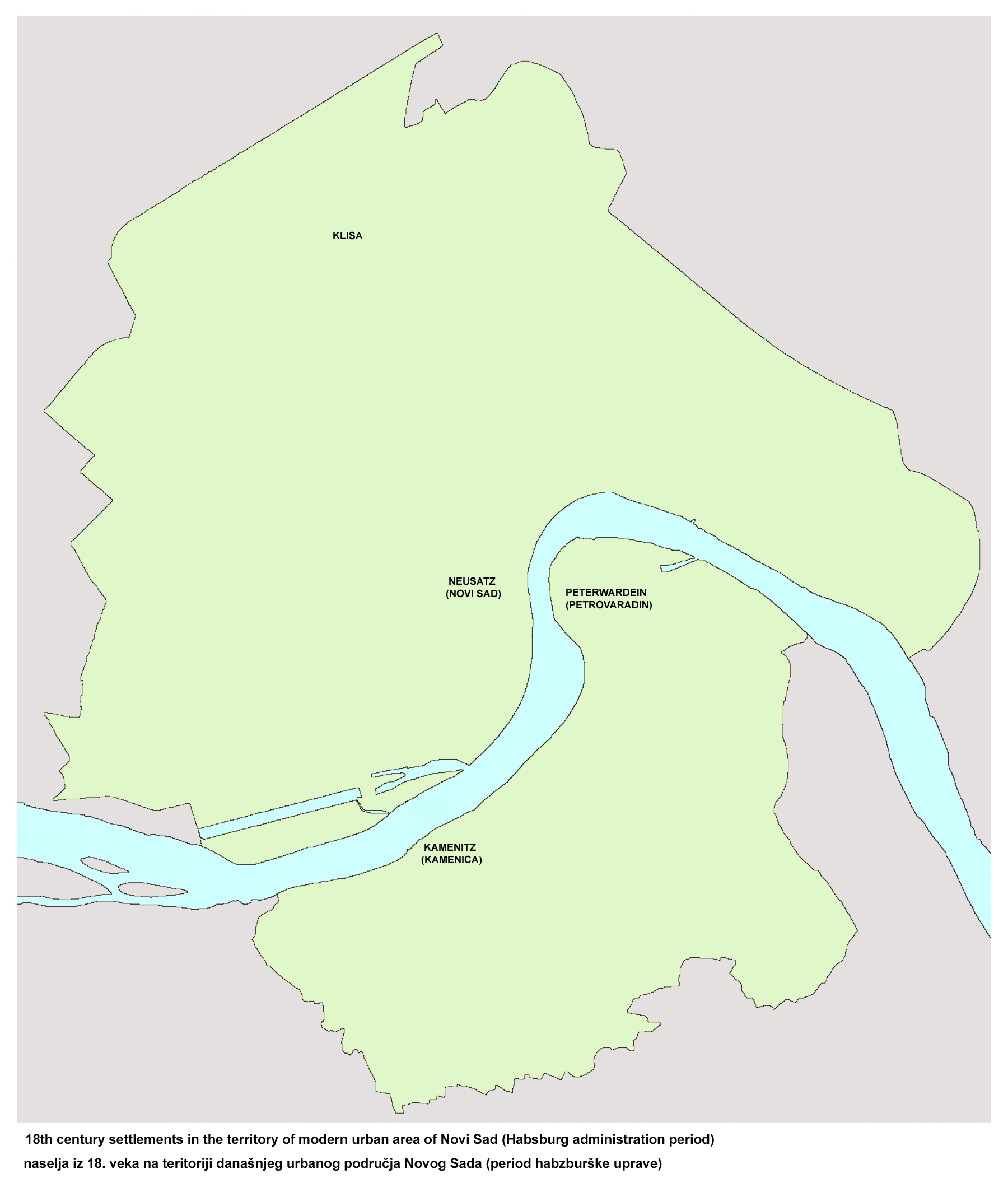
18th century settlements in the territory of modern urban area of Novi Sad (Habsburg administration period).

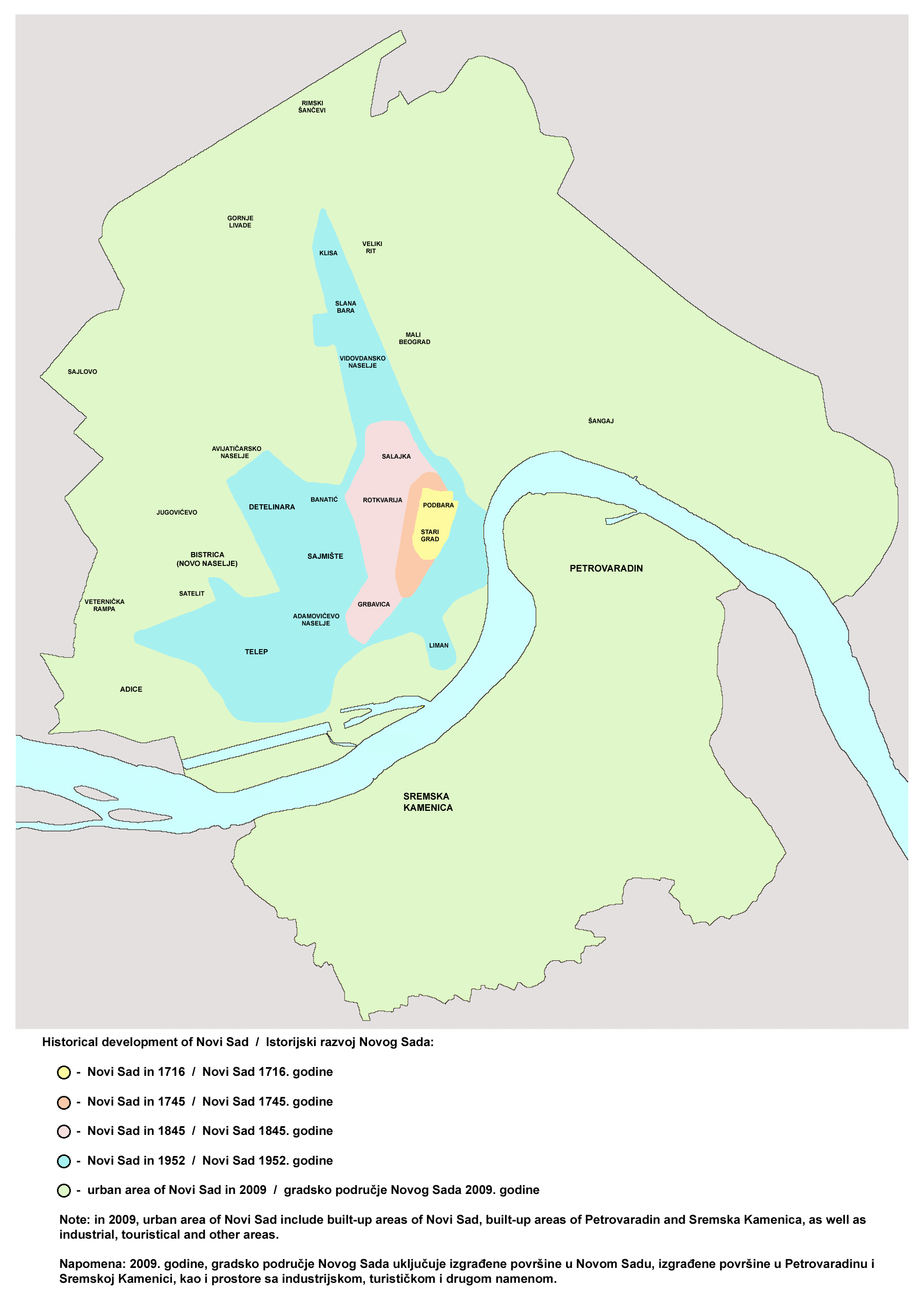
Historical development of Novi Sad, 1716–2009.

== See also ==
- NATO bombing of Novi Sad in 1999
- Demographic history of Novi Sad

== Bibliography ==
- Agneš Ozer, Petrovaradinska tvrđava – vodič kroz vreme i prostor, Novi Sad, 2002
- Agneš Ozer, Petrovaradin fortress – a guide through time and space, Novi Sad, 2002
- Boško Petrović – Živan Milisavac, Novi Sad – monografija, Novi Sad, 1987
- Branko Ćurčin, Slana Bara – nekad i sad, Novi Sad, 2002
- Branko Ćurčin, Novosadsko naselje Šangaj – nekad i sad, Novi Sad, 2004
- Đorđe Randelj, Novi Sad – slobodan grad, Novi Sad, 1997
- Jovan Mirosavljević, Brevijar ulica Novog Sada 1745–2001, Novi Sad, 2002
- Jovan Mirosavljević, Novi Sad – atlas ulica, Novi Sad, 1998
- Melhior Erdujhelji, Istorija Novog Sada, Novi Sad, 1894
- Milorad Grujić, Vodič kroz Novi Sad i okolinu, Novi Sad, 2004
- Mirjana Džepina, Društveni i zabavni život starih Novosađana, Novi Sad, 1982
- Petar Jonović, Knjižare Novog Sada 1790–1990, Novi Sad, 1990
- Petar Jonović – Dr Milan Vranić – Dr Dušan Popov, Znameniti knjižari i izdavači Novog Sada, Novi Sad, 1993
- Radenko Gajić, Petrovaradinska tvrđava – Gibraltar na Dunavu, Novi Sad, 1994
- Veljko Milković, Petrovaradin kroz legendu i stvarnost, Novi Sad, 2001
- Veljko Milković, Petrovaradin i Srem – misterija prošlosti, Novi Sad, 2003
- Veljko Milković, Petrovaradinska tvrđava – podzemlje i nadzemlje, Novi Sad, 2005
- Veljko Milković, Petrovaradinska tvrđava – kosmički lavirint otkrića, Novi Sad, 2007
- Zoran Knežev, Novi Sad : Priče iz prošlosti, Novi Sad, 2017
- Zoran Knežev, Vojvodina : Hronike i legende, Novi Sad, 2018
- Zoran Knežev, Novi Sad : Kafanoloija i prostitucija, Novi Sad, 2018
- Zoran Knežev, Novi Sad: Prošlost u pričama, Novi Sad, 2019
- Zoran Knežev, Turistički vodič kroz stari Novi Sad, Novi Sad, 2019
- Zoran Knežev, Vojvodina: Kazivanja i sećanja, Novi Sad, 2021
- Zoran Rapajić, Novi Sad bez tajni, Beograd, 2002
- Zvonimir Golubović, Racija u Južnoj Bačkoj 1942. godine, Novi Sad, 1991
- 30 godina mesne zajednice "7. Juli" u Novom Sadu 1974–2004 – monografija, Novi Sad, 2004
- Enciklopedija Novog Sada, sveske 1–26, Novi Sad, 1993–2005
- Sveske za istoriju Novog Sada, sveske 4–5, Novi Sad, 1993–1994
- Ustav za čitaonicu srpsku u Novom Sadu, Novi Sad, 1993
