= Aljmaš (disambiguation) =

Aljmaš can refer to:

- Aljmaš, Croatia, a village near Erdut, Croatia
- Aljmaš or Bácsalmás, a village in Hungary
- Aljmaš or Almaš, a former village in Bačka, Vojvodina, Serbia
