= Demographic history of Novi Sad =

Demographic history of Novi Sad, Serbia

This article is about demographic history of Novi Sad, the administrative center of Vojvodina and second largest city of Serbia.

== Ottoman Empire ==
| Year | Population |
|---|---|
| 1798 | 6,890 |
| 1843 | 17,332 |
| 1850 | 7,182 |
| 1869 | 19,119 |
| 1880 | 21,325 |
| 1890 | 24,717 |
| 1900 | 28,763 |
| 1910 | 33,089 |
| 1921 | 39,122 |
| 1931 | 63,985 |
| 1941 | 61,731 |
| 1948 | 69,760^{a} |
| 1953 | 77,197^{a} |
| 1961 | 103,600^{a} |
| 1971 | 144,637^{a} |
| 1981 | 174,111^{a} |
| 1991 | 192,426^{b} |
| 2002 | 253,791^{c} |
| 2011 | 294,976^{c} |
| 2022 | 325,511^{c} |
^{a} including Petrovaradin
^{b} including Petrovaradin and Sremska Kamenica
^{c} including Petrovaradin, Sremska Kamenica, Veternik, and Futog

During the Ottoman rule, Petrovaradin had 200 (mostly Muslim) houses. There was also a Christian quarter with 35 houses populated by ethnic Serbs. In the year 1590, population of all villages that existed in the territory of present-day Novi Sad (on the left bank of the Danube) numbered 105 houses inhabited exclusively by Serbs. However, Ottoman records mention only those inhabitants that paid taxes, thus the number of Serbs that lived in the area (for example those that served in the Ottoman army) was larger.

== Habsburg Empire ==
According to 1720 data, the population of Ratzen Stadt (later known as Novi Sad) was composed of 112 Serbian, 14 German, and 5 Hungarian houses.

In 1780, Novi Sad had about 2,000 houses, of which 1,144 were Serbian.

In 1820, Novi Sad had 20,000 inhabitants, of whom about 2/3 were Serbs.

According to the 1843 data, Novi Sad had 17,332 inhabitants, of whom 9,675 were Orthodox Christians, 5,724 Catholics, 1,032 Protestants, 727 Jews, and 30 adherents of the Armenian church. The largest ethnic group in the city were Serbs, and the second largest were Germans.

== Austria-Hungary ==
After 1867, Novi Sad was located within the Hungarian part of Austria-Hungary. During this time, the Magyarization policy of the Hungarian government drastically altered the demographic structure of the city, i.e. from the predominantly Serb, the population of the city became ethnically mixed. According to 1880 census, the percent of Serbian language speakers in the city was 41.2%, and the percent of Hungarian language speakers was 25.9%. Until 1910, the percent of Serbian language speakers decreased to 34.5%, while the percent of Hungarian language speakers increased to 39.7%.

According to the 1910 census, the city had 33,590 inhabitants, of which 13,343 (39.7%) most frequently spoke Hungarian, 11,594 (34.5%) Serbian, 5,918 (17.6%) German, 1,453 (4.3%) Slovak, etc. It is not certain whether Hungarians or Serbs were largest ethnic group in the city in this time, since 1910 census is considered partially inaccurate by most historians because this census did not record the population by ethnic origin or mother tongue, but by the "most frequently spoken language", thus the census results overstated the number of Hungarian speakers, since this was official language at the time and many non-Hungarian native speakers stated that they most frequently speak Hungarian language in everyday communication. The city was also home to 2,326 Jews, of whom many were native Hungarian speakers. Another feature of the census was that it did not only record permanent residents of the city, but also temporary residents, who did not live in the city, but were situated there as part of the civil and military services.

== Contemporary period ==
In the last three decades, Novi Sad experienced significant population growth. According to the 2022 census, the city's population in its administrative area stood at 368,967, while in its contiguous urban area (including adjacent settlements of Petrovaradin, Sremska Kamenica, Veternik, and Futog) there were 325,551 inhabitants. The ethnic structure of the administrative area of Novi Sad is as follows: Serbs (78.3%), Hungarians (2.6%), Slovaks (1.4%), Croats (1%), and others.

== See also ==
- History of Novi Sad
- Demographic history of Vojvodina
- Demographic history of Serbia
