= Almaški Kraj =

Almaški Kraj Алмашки Крај
- Urban neighborhood
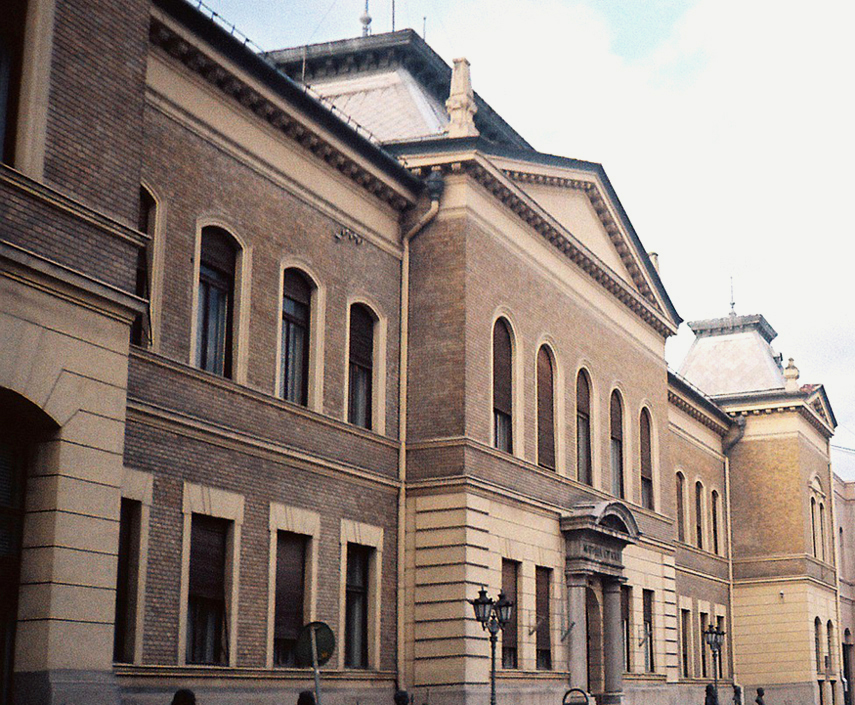
- Almaški Kraj, Matica srpska

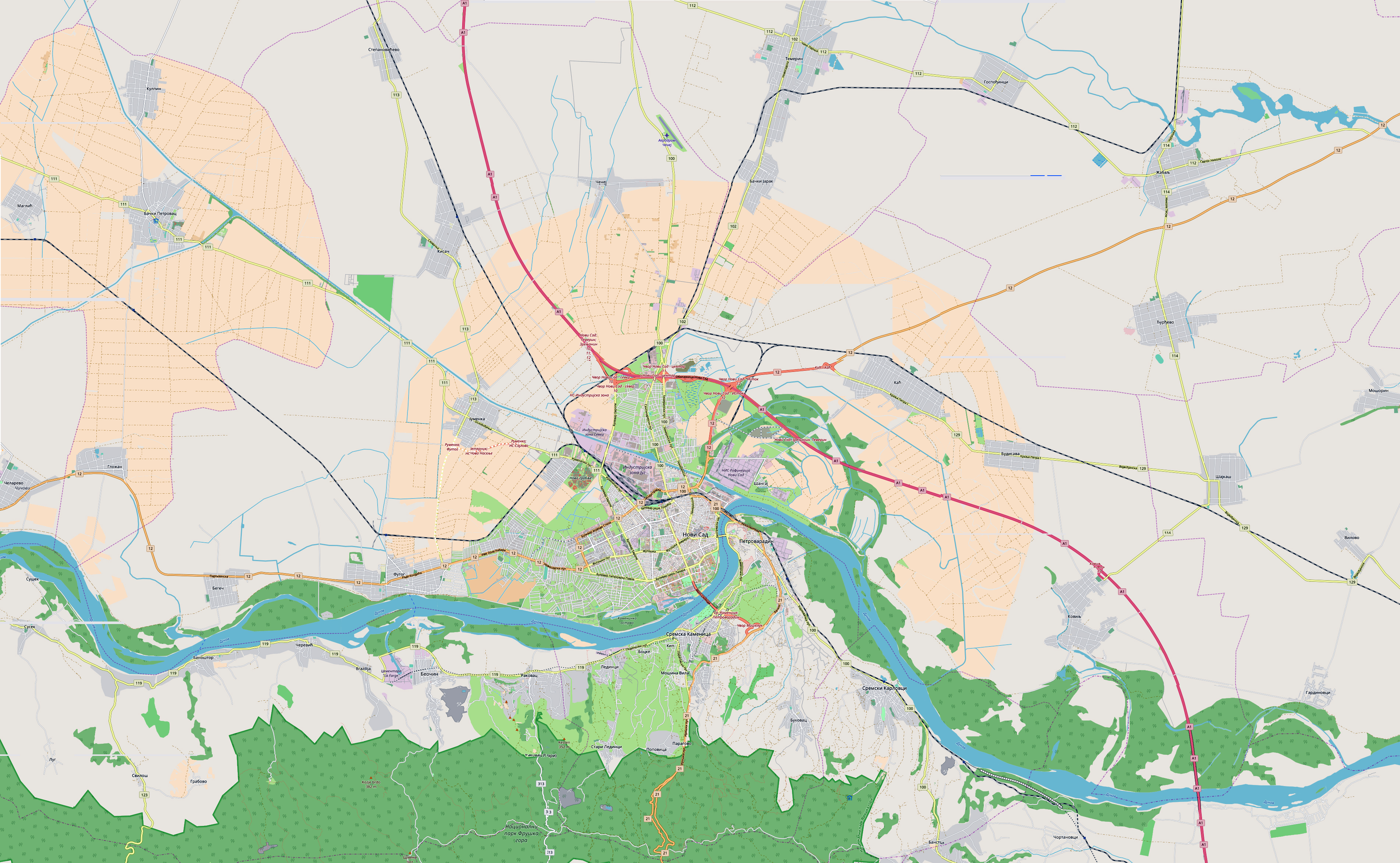
- Location within Novi Sad
- Coordinates: 45.2630°N 19.8467°E
- Country: Serbia
- Province: Vojvodina
- District: South Bačka
- Municipality: Novi Sad
- Time zone: UTC+1 (CET)
  - Summer (DST): UTC+2 (CEST)
- Area code: +381(0)21
- Car plates: NS

Almaški Kraj (Serbian: Алмашки Крај) is an urban neighborhood of the city of Novi Sad, Serbia. It is situated between the Almaška church and the Saborna church and includes parts of the Podbara, Salajka and Stari Grad neighborhoods. There is a cemetery nearby by the same name -- Almaški cemetery.

== History and culture ==
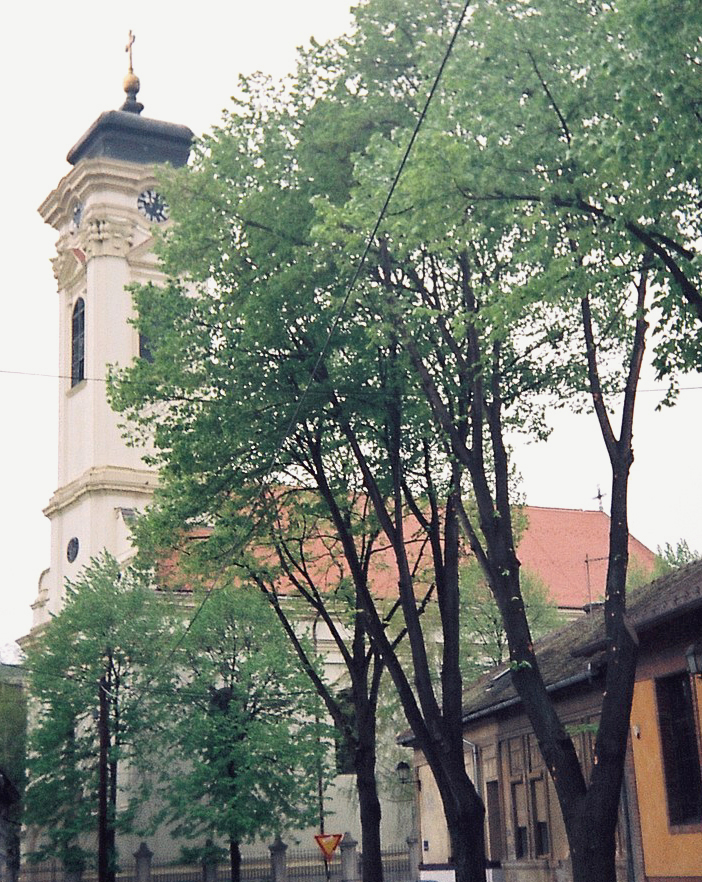
Almaški Kraj, Almaška Orthodox church

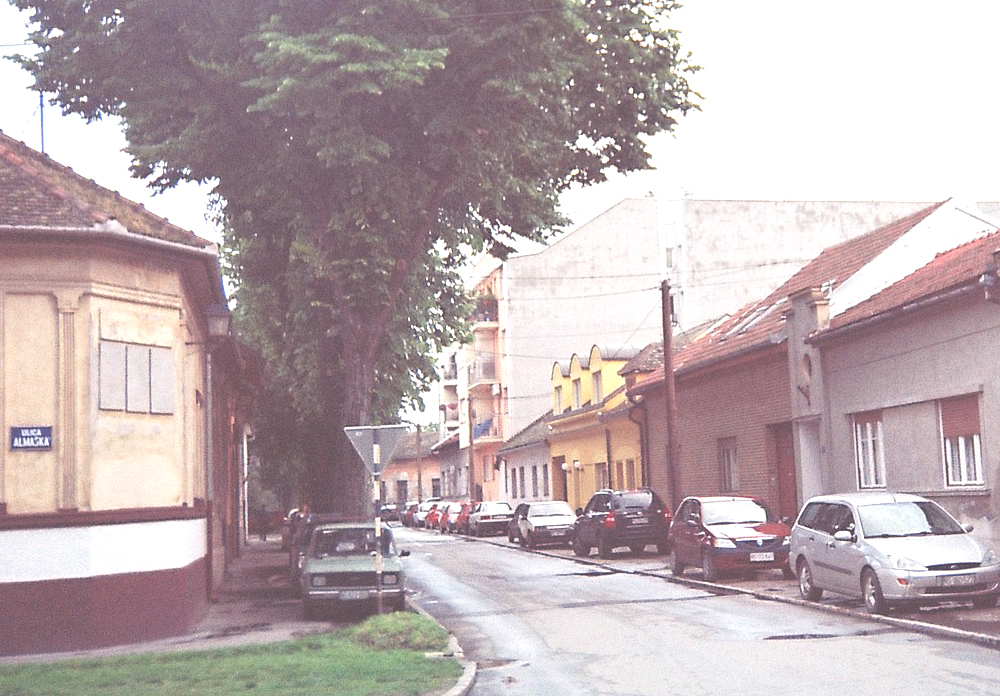
Street in Almaški Kraj

It was settled in 1718 by Serb families from the village Almaš, who thus named this part of the city Almaški Kraj ("the Almaš quarter"). The Almaš Orthodox church was built here in 1797. It is the largest Orthodox church in Novi Sad. The oldest cultural-scientific institution of Serbia, Matica srpska, is also located in Almaški Kraj.

== See also ==
- Neighborhoods of Novi Sad
- Almaš
