= Almaš =

Ethnic Serb village in Bačka

- Interactive map of Almaš
- Coordinates: 45.43°N 19.94°E
- Country: Serbia
- Region: South Bačka

Population (1715)
  - Total: 20 families

Almaš was an ethnic Serb village in Bačka. It existed until the first half of the 18th century. The village was located on Almaška bara (Almaška bog), between Temerin, Nadalj, and Gospođinci.

== Name ==
In Serbian the village is known as Almaš (Алмаш), Ajmaš (Ајмаш) or Aljmaš (Аљмаш); while in Hungarian it is known as Almás. The Hungarian name means "place of apples".

== History ==
According to the 1715 census, the population of the village numbered 20 Serb families. In 1718, the village was resettled and its inhabitants moved to Petrovaradinski Šanac (today Novi Sad), and settled in the area between present-day Almaška church and Saborna church. This part of the city was thus named Almaški Kraj ("the Almaš quarter").

== See also ==
- List of cities, towns and villages in Vojvodina
