= List of people from Novi Sad =

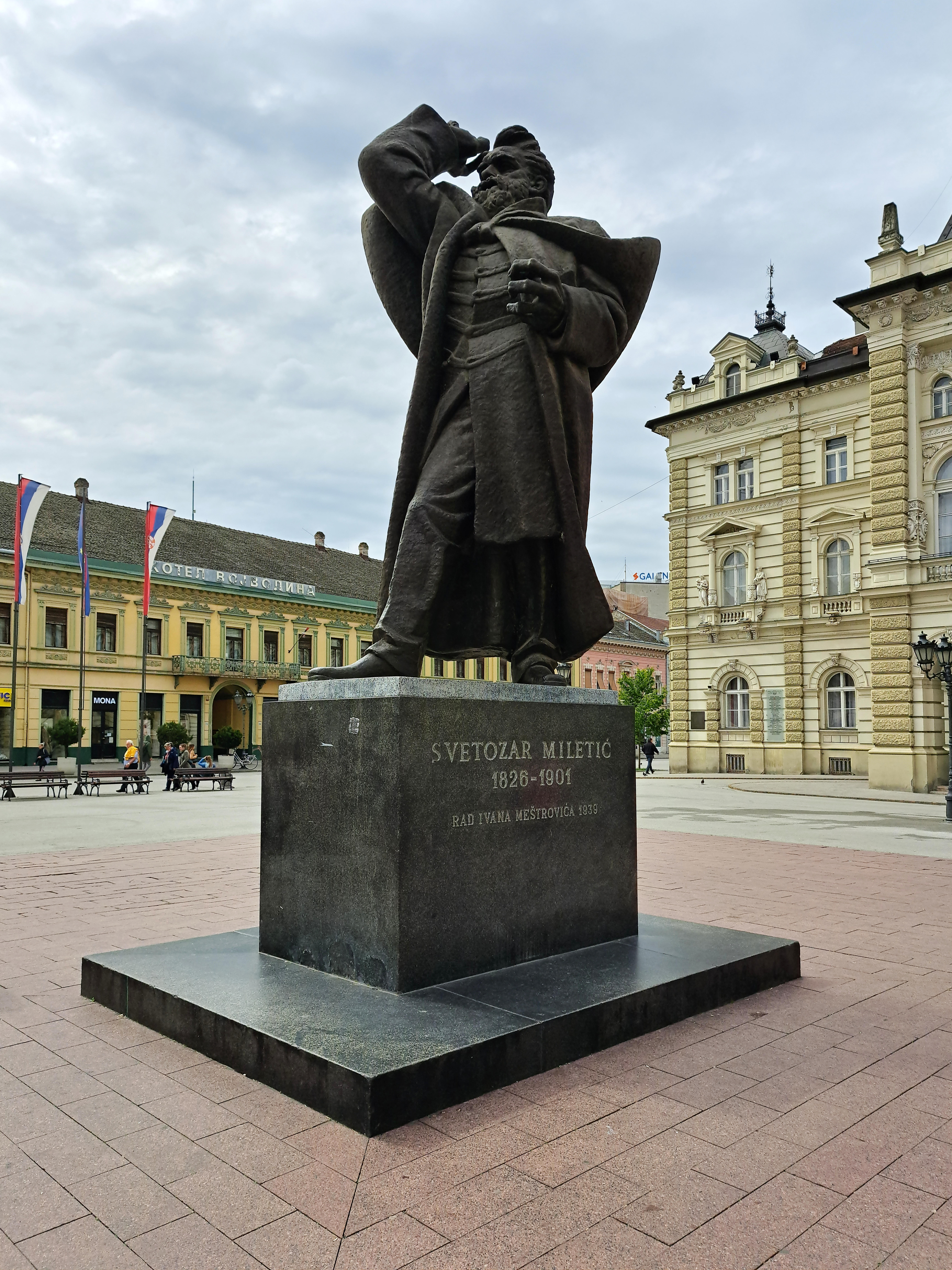
Statue of Svetozar Miletić in Novi Sad

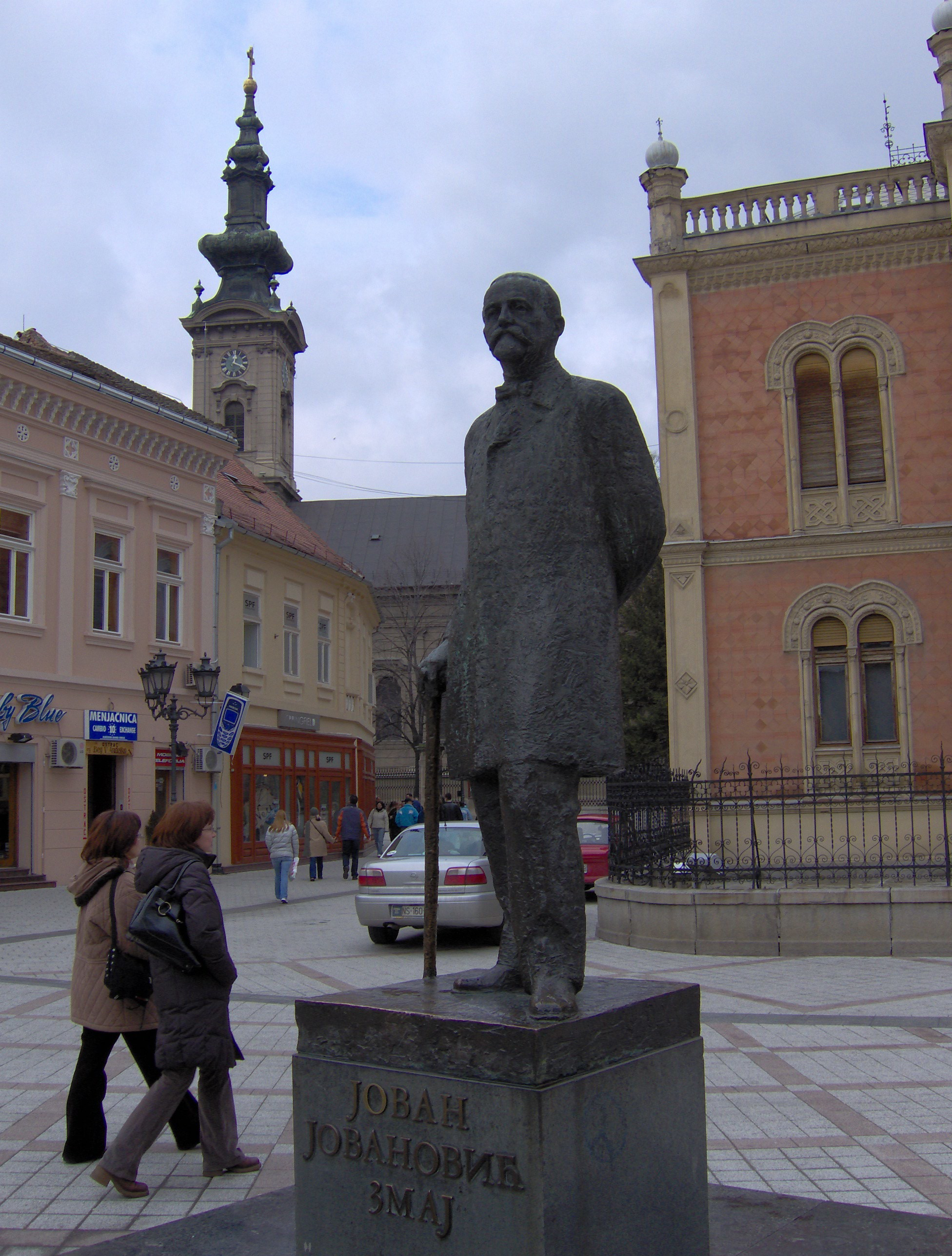
Statue of Jovan Jovanović Zmaj in Novi Sad

This is a list of famous or notable citizens of Novi Sad (included in the list are natives as well as permanent and/or temporary residents).

== Arts ==
=== Architecture ===
- Greta Ferušić (1924–2022), Bosnian Jewish architect; born in Novi Sad

=== Literature and poetry ===
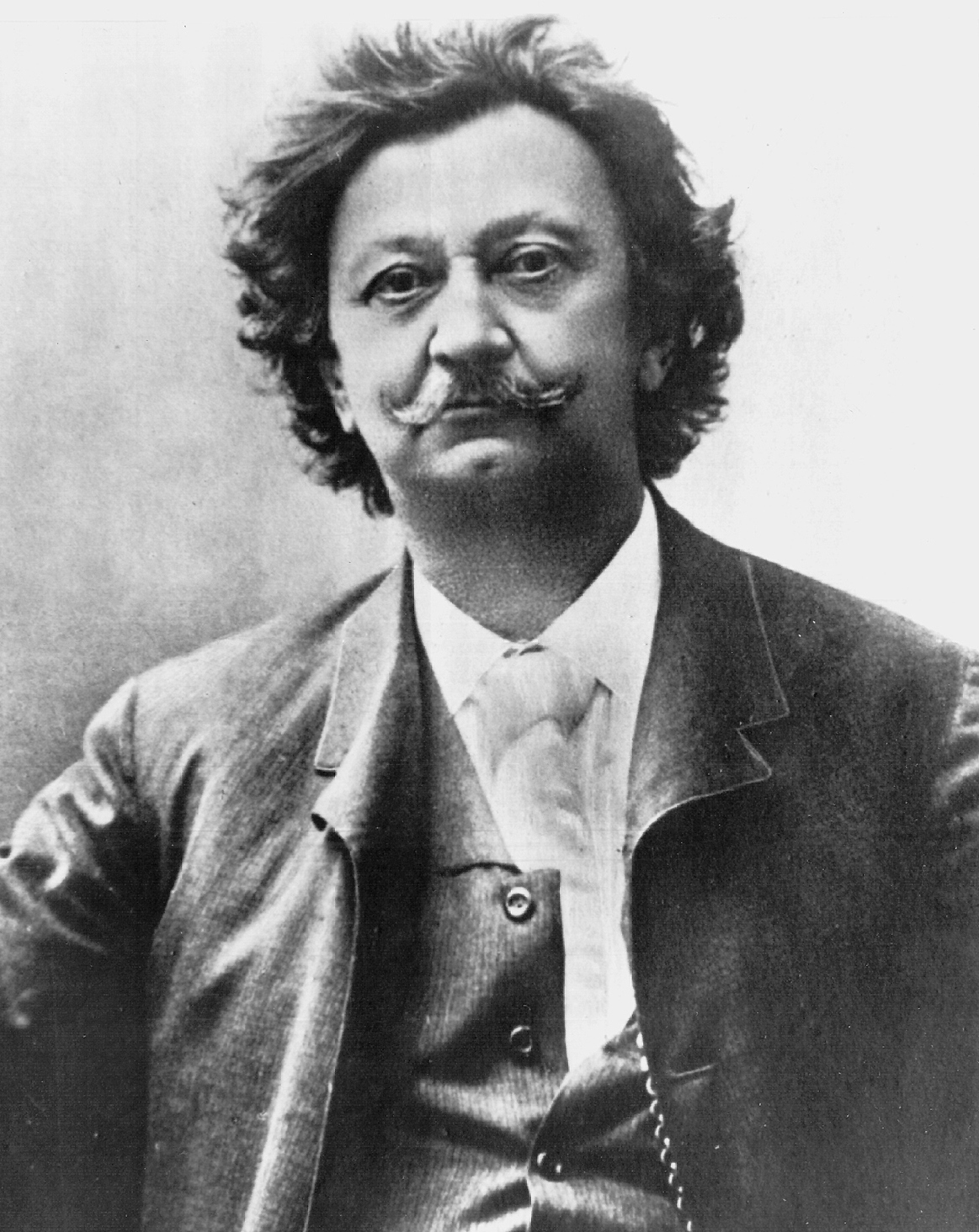
Laza Kostić (1841–1910)

Milica Stojadinović-Srpkinja (1830–1878)

- Aleksandar Tišma (1924–2003), writer; born in village Horgoš near Kanjiža and lived in Novi Sad
- Branislav Nušić (1864–1938), Serbian novelist, playwright, comediographer, story writer, essayist, founder of modern Rhetoric in Serbia; lived in Novi Sad
- Boško Petrović (1915–2001), Serbian novelist and poet, secretary and president of Matica Srpska; studied and lived in Novi Sad
- Danilo Kiš (1935–1989), possibly the best-known ex-Yugoslavian writer alongside the Nobel laureate Ivo Andrić; lived in Novi Sad
- Damjan Kaulić (1760–1810) Serbian publisher, bookseller and printer; only bookseller in Novi Sad until 1790; born in Sremski Karlovci and lived in Novi Sad.
- Đura Jakšić (1831–1878), Serb poet, painter, narrator, playwright, bohemian, and patriot; born in Srpska Crnja and lived in Novi Sad
- Jakov Ignjatović (1822–1889), writer; lived in Novi Sad
- Jovan Grčić Milenko (1846–1875), poet; born in village Čerević in Beočin municipality; attended gymnasium in Novi Sad
- Jovan Hadžić (1799–1869; pseudonym Miloš Svetić), one of the founders of Matica srpska and its first president; poet, literary historian, interpreter, lawyer; born in Sombor and lived in Novi Sad
- Jovan Jovanović Zmaj (1833–1904), one of the best-known Serb poets; born in Novi Sad
- Jovan Pačić (1771–1849), poet, painter and officer; born in Baja and lived in Novi Sad
- Jovan Rajić (1726–1801), writer and historian; born in Sremski Karlovci and lived in Novi Sad
- Kosta Trifković (1843–1875), Serb writer, one of the best comediographers of the time; born in Novi Sad
- Lajos Zilahy (1891−1974), author of the novel Two Prisoners
- Laza Kostić (1841–1910), Serb man of letters; born in the village of Kovilj near Novi Sad, and lived in Novi Sad
- Mika Antić (1932–1986), Serbian poet; born in village Mokrin near Kikinda and lived in Novi Sad
- Milica Stojadinović-Srpkinja (1830–1878), writer; born in village Bukovac near Novi Sad
- Mira Alečković (1924–2008), Serbian and Yugoslav poet; born in Novi Sad
- Pavel Jozef Šafárik (1795–1861), Slovak philologist, poet; one of the first scientific Slavists; literary historian, historian and ethnographer; lived in Novi Sad
- Pero Zubac (born 1945), Serbian and Yugoslav author, poet, screenwriter, academic, and journalist; born in Nevesinje in Bosnia and Herzegovina and resides in Novi Sad
- Vasa Stajić (1878–1947), writer and professor; born in village Mokrin near Kikinda and lived in Novi Sad
- Vasko Popa (1922–1991), Yugoslav poet of Romanian descent; lived in Novi Sad
- Vuk Stefanović Karadžić (1787–1864), Serb linguist and major reformer of the Serbian language; spent 1809/1810 winter in Novi Sad
- Zaharije Orfelin (1726–1785), Serbian polymath; born in Vukovar in Croatia and lived and died in Novi Sad.

=== Painting ===
- Alfréd Kemény (1895–1945), Hungarian artist and art critic; born in Novi Sad
- Anastas Bocarić (1864–1944), painter and teacher; born in Budva, Montenegro, lived and worked in Novi Sad (1911–1932)
- Dimitrije Avramović (1815–1855), painter; born in village Šajkaš in the Titel municipality and lived in Novi Sad
- Emerik Feješ (1904–1969), Hungarian–Serbian painter; born in Osijek in Croatia and lived in Novi Sad
- Igor Antić (born 1962), French–Serbian visual artist; born and raised in Novi Sad; son of Mika Antić
- Minya Mikic (born 1975) born as Minja Višekruna, Italian artist, painter, and graphic designer; born in Novi Sad
- Nikola Aleksić (1808–1873), painter; born in Arad in Romania and lived and worked in Novi Sad until 1826.
- Stevan Todorović (1832–1925), Serbian painter and the founder of modern fencing and Sokol movement in Yugoslavia; born in Novi Sad
- Uroš Predić (1857–1953), painter; born in village Orlovat in the Zrenjanin municipality and lived in Novi Sad
- Vasa Ostojić (1730–1791), Serbian Baroque icon and fresco painter; worked on Uspenska crkva in Novi Sad; died in Novi Sad

=== Comics ===
- Branislav Kerac (born 1952; also known as Bane Kerac), Serbian comic book creator; created and/or worked on Cat Claw, Tarzan, Zagor and Kobra comics
- Gradimir Smudja (born 1956), Serbian cartoonist and painter in Italy and France; born in Novi Sad
- Petar Meseldžija (born 1965), fantasy and comic book artist and illustrator
- Sibin Slavković (born 1953), comic book artist, illustrator and editor; created and worked on Tarzan, Il Grande Blek, Tex; born in Žunjevići and resides in Novi Sad since 1983

=== Sculpture ===
- Bojan Mikulić (born 1980), Serbian sculpture; realism and abstract art
- Đorđe Jovanović (1861–1953) Serbian sculptor and full member of Serbian Academy of Sciences and Arts; born in Novi Sad
- Jovan Pešić (1866–1936) Serbian sculptor and soldier
- Jovan Soldatović (1920–2005) Serbian sculpture; surrealism art; born in Čerević; lived and died in Novi Sad

=== Multiple art disciplines ===
- Emanuilo Janković (1758–1792), Serbian writer, dramatists, philosopher, translator, editor and scientist; born and raised in Novi Sad
- Jovan Grčić Milenko (1846–1875) Serbian poet, writer, physician; born in Čerević lived and studied in Novi Sad
- Jovan Hristić (1933–2002), Serbian poet, playwright, essayist, literary and theater critic, translator, editor; died in Sremska Kamenica in Novi Sad
- Milan Savić (1845–1930), Serbian physician writer, historian, philosopher, medical doctor, geographer, literary critic, translator, president of Matica srpska; lived and studied in Novi Sad
- Mladen Dražetin (1951–2015), doctor of social sciences, intellectual, economist, theatrical creator, poet, writer and philosopher. He was born and died in Novi Sad.
- Slobodan Jovanović (1869–1958) Serbian and Yugoslav writer, historian, lawyer, philosopher, literary critic, diplomat, and politician; born in Novi Sad

== Entertainment ==
=== Fashion and modeling ===
- Jovana Marjanović (born 1987), Serbian beauty pageant model; born in Novi Sad
- Sanja Papić (born 1984), Serbian supermodel and beauty pageant titleholder

=== Film, theater, and television ===
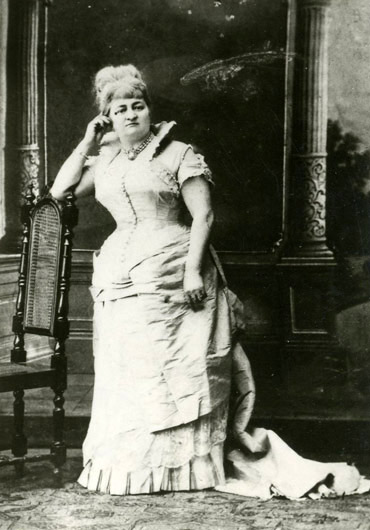
Draginja Ružić (1834–1905)

- Aleksandar Radenković (born 979), Serbian–German actor; born in Novi Sad
- Anton Hasenhut (1766–1841), Austrian comic theatre actor; born in Petrovaradin
- Bojana Ordinačev (born 1980), Serbian actress and model; born in Novi Sad
- Boris Isaković (born 1966), film actor
- Branka Veselinović (1918–2023), Serbian actress, oldest performing actress in Serbia; born in Stari Bečej and lived in Novi Sad
- Dimitrije Banjac (born 1976), Serbian actor, comedian, screenwriter; born in Novi Sad
- Dejan Ćirjaković (born 1979), television actor, comedian, screenwriter and musician
- Gordana Kamenarović (born 1958), actress
- Draginja Ružić (1834–1905), one of the first Serbian professional actresses; born in Vranjevo and lived in Novi Sad
- Dušan Kovačević (born 1948), playwright, scriptwriter, film director, academic, served as the ambassador of Serbia in Lisbon, Portugal; born in Mrđenovac and studied in Novi Sad
- Dušan Makavejev (1932–2019), Serbian film director and screenwriter; lived and studied in Novi Sad
- Iván Petrovich (1894–1962), Serbian–German film actor and singer; born in Novi Sad
- Jelena Tinska (born 1953; born as Jelena Petrović), Serbian actress, ballerina, dancer, writer, columnist, and television presenter
- Joakim Vujić (1772–1847), theatrical worker; lived in Novi Sad
- Josif Tatić (1946–2013), Serbian film and television actor; born in Novi Sad
- Lena Bogdanović (born 1974), film actress
- Marija Omaljev-Grbić (born 1982), Croatian–American film, theater and television actress; born in Novi Sad
- Márton Garas (1881–1930), Hungarian film director; born in Novi Sad
- Mihailo Janketić (1938–2019), Serbian actor
- Mira Banjac (born 1929), actress; born in Erdevik in the Šid municipality and resides in Novi Sad
- Nikola Škorić (born 1976), Serbian actor, comedian and screenwriter; born in Rijeka in Croatia and lives in Novi Sad
- Nina Seničar (born 1985), Serbian film and television actress; model; born in Novi Sad
- Petar Kralj (1941–2011), Serbian theater, film and television actor; born in Zagreb, lived and studied in Novi Sad
- Radoslav Milenković (born 1958), actor and theater director
- Stojan Matavulj (born 1961), Croatian actor; born in Novi Sad
- Vladimir Tintor (born in 1978), Serbian actor; born in Novi Sad
- Želimir Žilnik (born 1942), award-winning film director; born in Novi Sad
- Zorka Todosić (1864–1936), Serbian stage actress and operetta singer; born in Novi Sad

=== Games and toys ===
- Ivan Moscovich (1926–2023), Yugoslav-Hungarian inventor of Jewish descent, designer and commercial developer of puzzles, games, toys, and educational aids; born in Novi Sad

=== Music ===
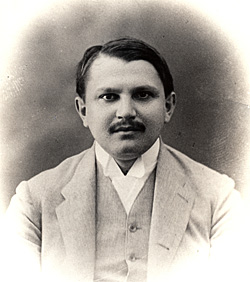
Isidor Bajić (1878–1915)

- Aleksandra Vrebalov (born 1970), Serbian composer based in New York City; lived in Novi Sad
- Baruch Arnon (born 1940), Serbian Jewish classical pianist and music teacher; born in Novi Sad
- Boris Kovač (born 1955), musician and composer from Novi Sad
- Cveta Majtanović (born 1986), singer, songwriter, psychologist, engineer, winner of the 2004 Idol Serbia, Montenegro & Macedonia competition
- Darko Radovanović (1975–2011) Serbian singer; born in Novi Sad
- Đorđe Balašević (1953–2021), prominent Serbian songwriter and singer; born in Novi Sad
- Isidor Bajić (1878–1915), composer; born in Kula, lived in Novi Sad
- Janika Balaž (1925–1988), musician; lived in Novi Sad
- Josif Runjanin (1821–1878), Serb composer and lieutenant-colonel in the Austro-Hungarian Army; born in Vinkovci in Srem (then part of Austrian Empire); died in Novi Sad
- Ljiljana Petrović (1939–2020), singer; born in Bosanski Brod in Bosnia and Herzegovina and raised in Novi Sad
- Marko Nešić (1873–1938), Serbian composer and tamburitza musician
- Mihajlo Obrenov (born 1982; pseudonym MiKKa), musician and composer; founder of Crime:Scene records; from Novi Sad
- Milenko Paunović (1889–1924), Serbian composer and writer; author of the first Serbian musical drama; born in the village of Újszentiván in Hungary and lived in Novi Sad
- Mitar Subotić (1961–1999), known as Suba and Rex Illusivi; eclectic musician and producer, electronic music pioneer in SFR Yugoslavia; born and raised in Novi Sad
- Nataša Bekvalac (born 1980), Serbian pop singer
- Rada Adžić (born 1976; pseudonym Dara Bubamara), Serbian pop-folk singer
- Rudolf Brucci (1917–2002) Croatian-Italian composer; born in Zagreb, lived and studied in Novi Sad
- Stefan Milenković (born 1977), Serbian violinist; director of the Concert hall of Novi Sad since 2020
- Svetozar Saša Kovačević (born 1950), Serbian composer, music pedagogue and church organist; born in Zabalj and lived in Novi Sad
- Tea Tairović (born 1996) Serbian pop-folk singer and songwriter
- Tijana Bogićević (born 1981), Serbian singer; represented Serbia in the Eurovision Song Contest in 2011 and 2017; born in Novi Sad

== Sciences ==
=== Biology ===
- Adolf Hempt (1874–1943), biologist; founder of the Pasteur Institute in Novi Sad; born in Novi Sad
- Dušan Kanazir (1921–2009), Serbian molecular biologist, president of Serbian Academy of Sciences and Arts; lived and studied in Novi Sad
- Miloš Marić (1885–1944), histologist; brother of Mileva Marić; head of the department of histology at the Saratov State University in Russia; researched in the field of mitosis and amitosis, which laid the foundation for cloning; born in Ruma and lived in Novi Sad

=== Chemistry ===
- Pavle Trpinac (1905–1991), Serbian chemist and professor; born and raised in Novi Sad
- Vojtěch Šafařík (1829–1902), Czech chemist of Slovak descent; born in Novi Sad

=== Mathematics ===
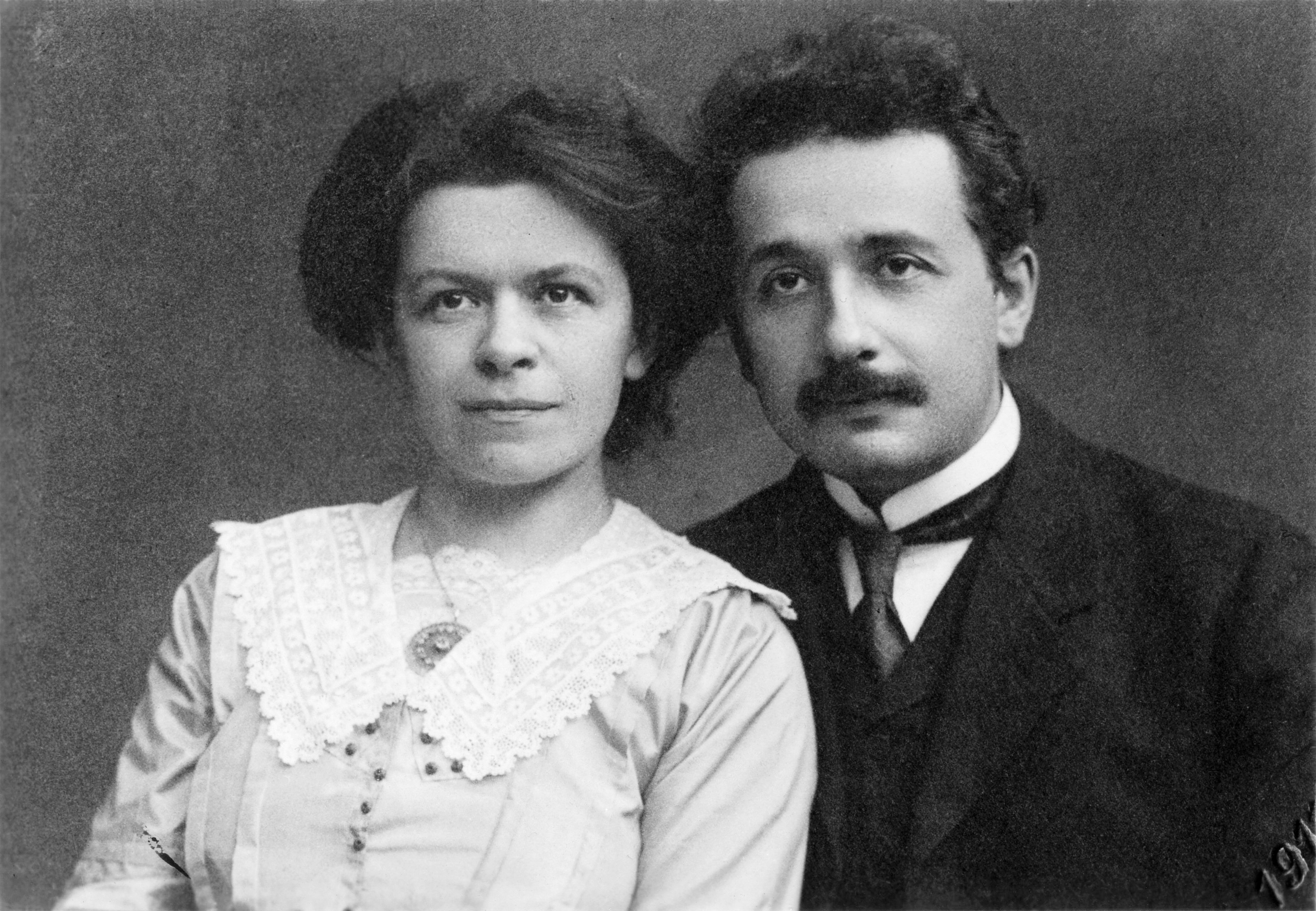
Albert and Mileva Einstein, 1912

- Bogdan Gavrilović (1864–1947), mathematician physicist, philosopher and educator; born in Novi Sad
- Mileva Marić (1875–1948), mathematician; Albert Einstein's first wife; sister of Miloš Marić; born in Titel and lived in Novi Sad
- Olga Hadžić (1946–2019), mathematician; rector of the University of Novi Sad and the first woman rector in Serbia; born and lived in Novi Sad

=== Physics ===
- Albert Einstein (1879-1955), theoretical physicist of profound genius; widely regarded as the greatest scientist of the 20th century; lived in Novi Sad 1905-1907 (in Kisačka Street 20) with his wife, Mileva Marić

=== Psychology ===
- Milenko Vlajkov (born 1950), psychologist and psychotherapist, author and meditation master; born in Novi Sad

== Scholars ==
- Branko Mikasinovich (born 1938), Serbian-American slavist, journalist
- Đuro Daničić (1825–1882), Serbian philologist, translator, linguist historian and lexicographer; born and studied in Novi Sad

== Business ==
- Ignjat Sopron (1821–1894), German journalist, publisher, and printer; born in Novi Sad
- Milan Mandarić (born 1938), Serbian-American businessman, born in Gospić in Croatia and grew up in Novi Sad
- Ratko Butorović (1956–2013), businessmen, former owner of FK Vojvodina, Hotel Park, and Hotel Leopold I
- Robert Čoban (born 1968), co-owner and president of Color Press Group; born in Bač and resides in Novi Sad

== Politics ==
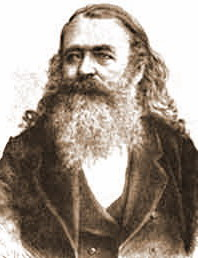
Svetozar Miletić (1826-1901)

- Aleksandra Đanković (born 1987), politician, born in Novi Sad
- Čedomir Božić (born 1984), politician; born in Novi Sad
- David Daka Popović (1886–1967), engineer, army officer, architect, journalist, historian, and politician; served as the first Ban of Danube Banovina, Minister of Land Reform and a senator of Senate of Kingdom of Yugoslavia
- Gojko Palalić (born 1988), politician; born in Novi Sad.
- István Pásztor (1956–2023); Hungarian politician; president of the Assembly of Vojvodina (2012–2023); born in Novi Kneževac; lived and died in Novi Sad
- Jaša Tomić (1856–1922), publicist and politician; lived in Novi Sad
- Josip Jelačić (1801–1859), the Ban of Croatia 1848-1859; born in Petrovaradin
- Jovan Dejanović (1927–2019), Serbian Yugoslav politician; mayor of Novi Sad (1974–1982); responsible for the construction of Liberty Bridge, modern building of the Serbian National Theatre, and SPC Vojvodina
- Maja Gojković (born 1963), Serbian politician; mayor of Novi Sad (2004–2008); president of the National Assembly of Serbia (2014–2020)
- Milan Đurić (born 1977), Serbian politician and lawyer, mayor of Novi Sad (2022–2025)
- Milan D. Kovačević (1821–1883), Serbian teacher and activist; born in Petrovaradin
- Miloš Vučević (born 1974), Serbian politician; mayor of Novi Sad (2012–2022)
- Nada Lazić (born 1950), politician; resides in Novi Sad
- Jovan Subotić (1817–1886), politician and writer; born in village Dobrinci near Ruma and lived in Novi Sad
- Lazar Paču (1855–1915), politician, doctor, Minister of Finance of the Kingdom of Serbia, lived and studied in Novi Sad
- Slobodan Jovanović (1869–1958), prime minister of the Yugoslav government in exile during World War II; born in Novi Sad
- Stevan Branovački (1804–1880), advocate, politician, mayor of Novi Sad, president of Matica Srpska; one of the founders of Serbian National Theatre; lived in Novi Sad
- Svetozar Miletić (1826–1901), advocate, politician, mayor of Novi Sad, the political leader of Serbs in Vojvodina; born in the village Mošorin in Šajkaška
- Yosef Lapid (1931–2008), justice minister of Israel; born in Novi Sad
- Žarko Mićin (born 1982), Serbian politician; mayor of Novi Sad (2025–Incumbent)

== Clergy ==
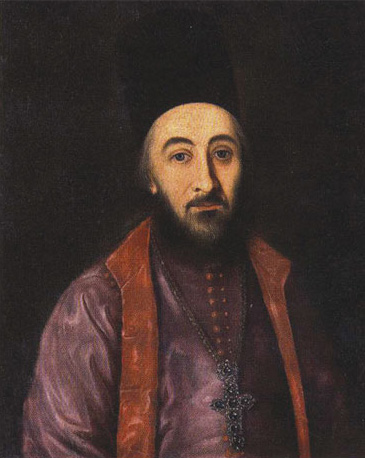
Visarion Pavlović (1670–1756)

- German Anđelić (1822–1888), Bishop of Eparchy of Bačka (1874-1882), born in Sremski Karlovci and lived in Novi Sad
- German Opačić (1857–1899), Bishop of Eparchy of Bačka (1893-1899), born in Slabinja, lived and buried in Novi Sad
- Georgije Hranislav (1775–1843), Bishop of Eparchy of Bačka (1839-1843); born in Ruma and lived in Novi Sad
- Irinej Bulović (born 1947), Bishop of Eparchy of Bačka (1990-Incumbent), born in Stanišić and lives in Kovilj near Novi Sad
- Josif Jovanović Šakabenta (1743–1805), Bishop of Eparchy of Bačka (1783-1786); born in Irig and lived in Novi Sad
- Jovan Jovanović (1732–1805), Bishop of Eparchy of Bačka (1786-1805); born in Sremski Karlovci and lived in Novi Sad
- Mojsije Putnik (1728–1790), Bishop of Eparchy of Bačka (1757-1774) and Metropolitan of Sremski Karlovci (1781-1790)
- Platon Atanacković (1788–1867), Bishop of Eparchy of Bačka (1851-1867) and president of president of Matica srpska; born in Sombor, lived and died in Novi Sad
- Porfirije (born 1961), 46th patriarch of the Serbian Orthodox Church; born in Bečej, lived and studied in Novi Sad
- Stefan Stanković (1788–1841), Bishop of Eparchy of Buda (1829-1834), Bishop of Eparchy of Bačka (1834-1837) and Metropolitan of Sremski Karlovci (1836-1841); born in Sremski Karlovci and lived in Novi Sad
- Visarion Pavlović (1670–1756), Bishop of Eparchy of Bačka (1731–1756)

== Philanthropy ==
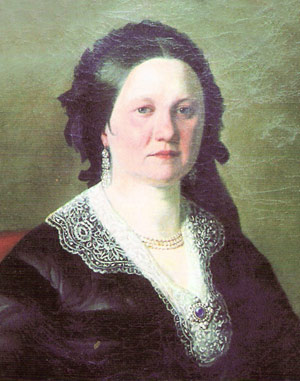
Marija Trandafil (1816–1883)

- Marija Trandafil (1816–1883), Serbian philanthropist; helped rebuild Novi Sad after the 1848 Hungarian Revolution
- Sava Tekelija (1761–1842), first Serbian doctor of law; founder of Tekelijanum; president of Matica srpska; philanthropist, noble and merchant; born in Arad in Romania
- Savka Subotić (1834–1918), Serbian political activist, philanthropist and one of the first leading feminists in Vojvodina

== Military ==
- Đorđe Sečujac (1715–1759), Serb Habsburg military commander; lived in Novi Sad
- Judita Alargić (1917–2011), member of the Yugoslav Partisans; born in Novi Sad
- Kosta Nađ (1911–1986), Yugoslav Partisan army general; born in Petrovaradin

== Sports ==
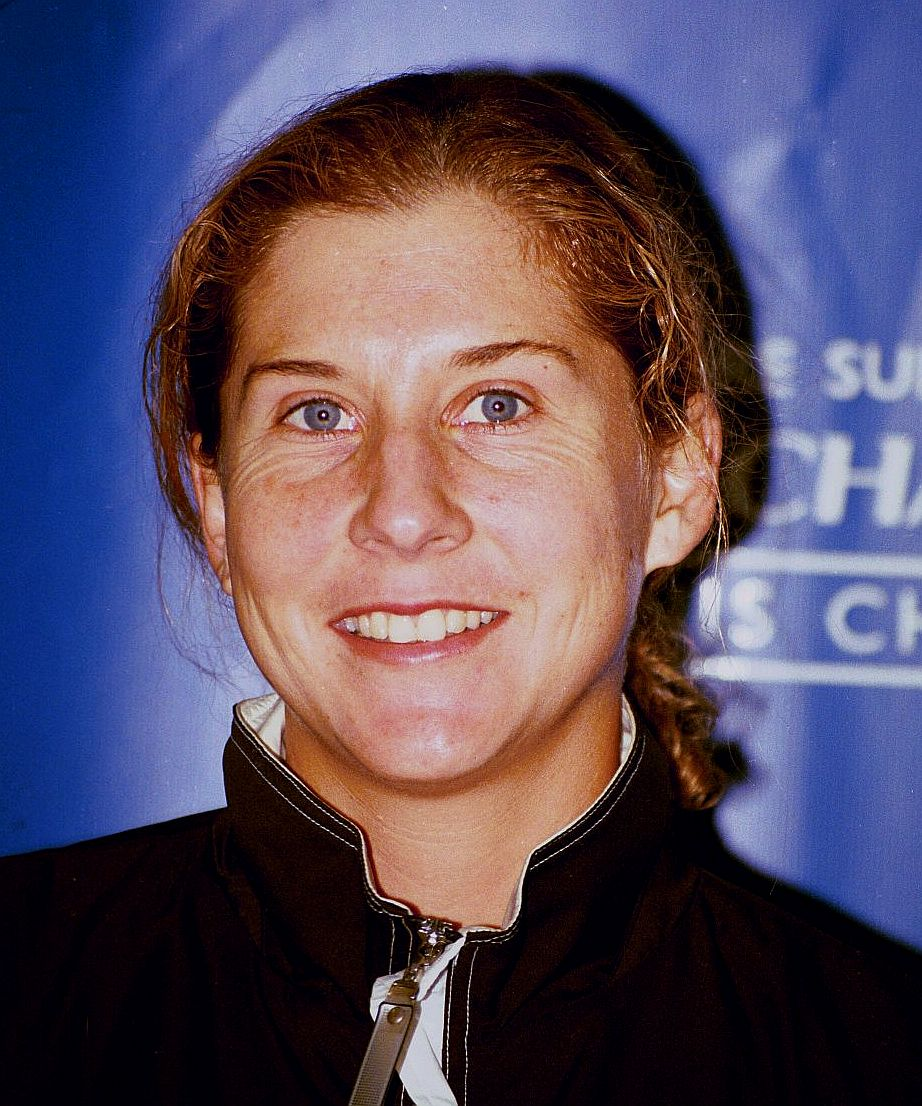
Monika Seleš, 1999

=== Basketball ===
- Darko Miličić (born 1985), professional basketball player for the Orlando Magic, taken 2nd overall in the 2003 NBA draft; born in Novi Sad
- Dragan Tarlać (born 1973), retired professional basketball player with Olympiakos, Chicago Bulls, Real Madrid, and CSKA Moscow; born and grew up in Novi Sad
- Jovo Stanojević (born 1977), professional basketball player; born in Sombor and resides in Novi Sad
- Milan Gurović (born 1975), professional basketball player with an illustrious career on the Serbia-Montenegro national team and club career stops all over Europe; born and grew up in Novi Sad
- Nikola Milutinov (born 1994), professional basketball player for the Olympiacos; born and grew up in Novi Sad
- Aleksandar Zečević (born 1996), Serbian basketball player in the Israeli Basketball Premier League

=== Canoe ===
- Bora Sibinkić (born 1978), professional sprint canoer, president of the kayak and canoe club Vojvodina; born in Novi Sad
- Petar Sibinkić (born 1976), professional sprint canoer, competed at the 1996 and 2000 Summer Olympic games; born and grew up in Novi Sad

=== Chess ===
- Branko Damljanović (born 1961), Serbian chess grandmaster (1989)
- Dragoljub Čirić (1935–2014), Serbian and Yugoslav chess grandmaster (1965)
- Mirko Bröder (1911–1943), Yugoslav-Hungarian chess master of Jewish descent; born in Budapest, lived and died in Novi Sad
- Ljubica Živković (1936–2017), Serbian and Yugoslav chess player, held the FIDE title of the Woman International Master in 1966, winner of the 1959 Yugoslav Women's Chess Championship; born in Bukovac, lived and died in Novi Sad

=== Football ===
- Aleksandar Sedlar (born 1991), professional footballer
- Damir Stojak (born 1975), retired professional footballer
- Danijel Aleksić (born 1991), professional footballer; born in Pula in Croatia, raised in Veternik, and lived in Novi Sad
- Dušan Tadić (born 1988), professional footballer born in Bačka Topola and residing in Novi Sad
- Gojko Kačar (born 1987), professional footballer
- Goran Šaula (born 1970), retired professional footballer
- Janko Sanković (born 1960s), retired professional football goalkeeper
- Mijat Gaćinović (born 1995), professional footballer
- Milan Jovanović (born 1981), retired professional footballer born in Bajina Bašta and residing in Novi Sad
- Milan Stepanov (born 1983), retired professional footballer; born in Kisač near Novi Sad
- Miloš Krasić (born 1984), retired professional footballer born in Kosovska Mitrovica and residing in Novi Sad
- Luka Drobnjak (born 2004), professional footballer
- Ljubomir Lovrić (1920–1994), late professional goalkeeper and later football coach; born and raised in Novi Sad
- Radoslav Samardžić (born 1970), retired professional footballer; born in the village of Karavukovo in the Odžaci municipality and resides in Novi Sad
- Sergej Milinković-Savić (born 1995), professional footballer; born in Lleida in Spain and lived in Novi Sad
- Slaviša Jokanović (born 1968), retired professional footballer currently working as manager; born and raised in Novi Sad
- Srđan Plavšić (born 1995), professional footballer
- Vanja Milinković-Savić (born 1997), professional footballer; born in Ourense in Spain and lived in Novi Sad
- Vujadin Boškov (1931–2014), professional footballer and famous coach; born in the nearby village of Begeč; spent most of his life in Novi Sad
- Željko Brkić (born 1986), professional footballer

=== Handball ===
- Aleksandra Stamenić (born 1998), professional handball player; born in Novi Sad
- Nataša Lovrić (born 2000), professional handball player; born in Novi Sad

=== Rowing ===
- Dragan Obradović (born 1957), professional rower; competed in the men's quadruple sculls event at the 1980 Summer Olympics; born in Novi Sad
- Iva Obradović (born 1984), professional rower; won the silver medal in the women's double scull event at the 2011 European Rowing Championships; born in Novi Sad
- Ivana Filipović (born 1989), professional rower; won the silver medal in the Women's Double Sculls event at the 2011 European Rowing Championships; born in Novi Sad
- Zoran Pančić (born 1953), professional rower; won a silver medal in the men's double sculls at the 1980 Summer Olympics and bronze in the men's double sculls at the 1984 Summer Olympics; born in Novi Sad

=== Shooting ===
- Aleksandra Ivošev (born 1974), Olympic gold medalist

=== Tennis ===
- Monika Seleš (born 1973), former World No. 1 female tennis player; born in Novi Sad
- Tatjana Ječmenica (born 1978), tennis coach; former tennis player

=== Track and field ===
- Ivana Španović (born 1990), professional long jumper; born in Zrenjanin and residing in Novi Sad
- Milica Gardašević (born 1998), professional long jumper

== See also ==
- List of honorary citizens of Novi Sad
- List of people from Belgrade
