= Jelena Kocić =

Serbian politician

Jelena Kocić (Serbian Cyrillic: Јелена Коцић; born 1990) is a politician in Serbia. A member of the Serbian Progressive Party, she was awarded a mandate to serve in the National Assembly of Serbia on 10 March 2021.

== Private career ==
Kocić holds a Bachelor of Laws degree. She lives in Donji Bunibrod in the municipality of Leskovac. She worked as deputy secretary of the city assembly of Leskovac during the 2016–20 term.

== Politician ==
Kocić was elected as a vice-president of the Leskovac city board of the Progressive Party on 4 March 2019.

She received the 198th position on the Progressive Party's Aleksandar Vučić — For Our Children electoral list in the 2020 Serbian parliamentary election and missed direct election when the list won 188 out of 250 mandates. She was awarded a mandate on 10 March 2021 as a replacement for Žarko Mićin, who had resigned.
