= Milan D. Kovačević =

Serbian teacher and activist

Milan D. Kovačević (Serbian Cyrillic: Милан Д. Ковачевић; 1821–1883) was a Serbian teacher and activist. He has been described as one of the hardest working Serbian educational and national workers of the 19th century.

He was born in Petrovaradin in 1821, into the large family of Kovačević. His given name was Milovan, while his patronymic, noted as his middle initial, was Davidov (Милован Давидов Ковачевић). According to tradition their ancestors lived in Gračanica in Kosovo, which they left in the "Great Migration" under Patriarch Arsenije III Čarnojević during the Great Turkish War (1690s), and settled in Bosnia.

In 1858, he left for Pristina, at the time part of the Ottoman Empire (now Kosovo). In 1858 or 1859, Kovačević and merchant Dane Filipović founded the Serbian school in Pristina. At that time there were eight Turkish schools in the town. In the mid-19th century, the most notable Serbian educators (as founders of secular schools) in "Old Serbia" (part of the Ottoman Empire) were Nikola Musulin in Prizren, Kovačević in Pristina, and Sava Dečanac and Milan Popović in Peć. In 1868, he moved to Vranje, which was under Ottoman rule and where Bulgarian propaganda started to spread. He employed his earlier student Zarija as his assistant. After the Serbian–Ottoman War (1876–78), the Ottoman military court in Pristina made it hard for the Ottoman Serbs; apart from the Prizren region, the old schools that worked under the wing of the Russian consulate were closed down, and the teachers fled or were imprisoned. Those few that managed to stay open, were stripped of all curriculum but literacy, to be taught without books. After this, Kovačević moved to Pirot, part of the newly acquired territories from the war (along with towns Niš, Vranje, Bela Palanka). While working in Pirot (1879–83), he wrote Istorija srpskog naroda ("The History of the Serb People").

== See also ==
- Nikola Musulin (1830–1897), teacher and activist
- Sava Dečanac, teacher and activist
- Milan Popović, teacher and activist
- Jordan H. Konstantinović, teacher, writer and activist
- Denko Krstić (1824–1882), teacher and activist
- Despot Badžović (1850–1930), teacher and activist

== Sources ==
- Brastvo. Vol. 24–26. Društvo sv. Save. 1930. p. 26.
- Brastvo. Vol. 29. Društvo sv. Save. 1938. p. 33.
- Vardar. Kolo srpskikh sestara. 1938.
