= Milan Đurić =

Milan Đurić may refer to:

- Milan Đurić (politician) (born 1977), Serbian politician and lawyer
- Milan Đurić (footballer, born 1987), Serbian association football midfielder
- Milan Đurić (footballer, born 1990), Bosnian association football forward
