= Halina Ryffert =

Polish cryptographer, mathematician (1916 - 1996)

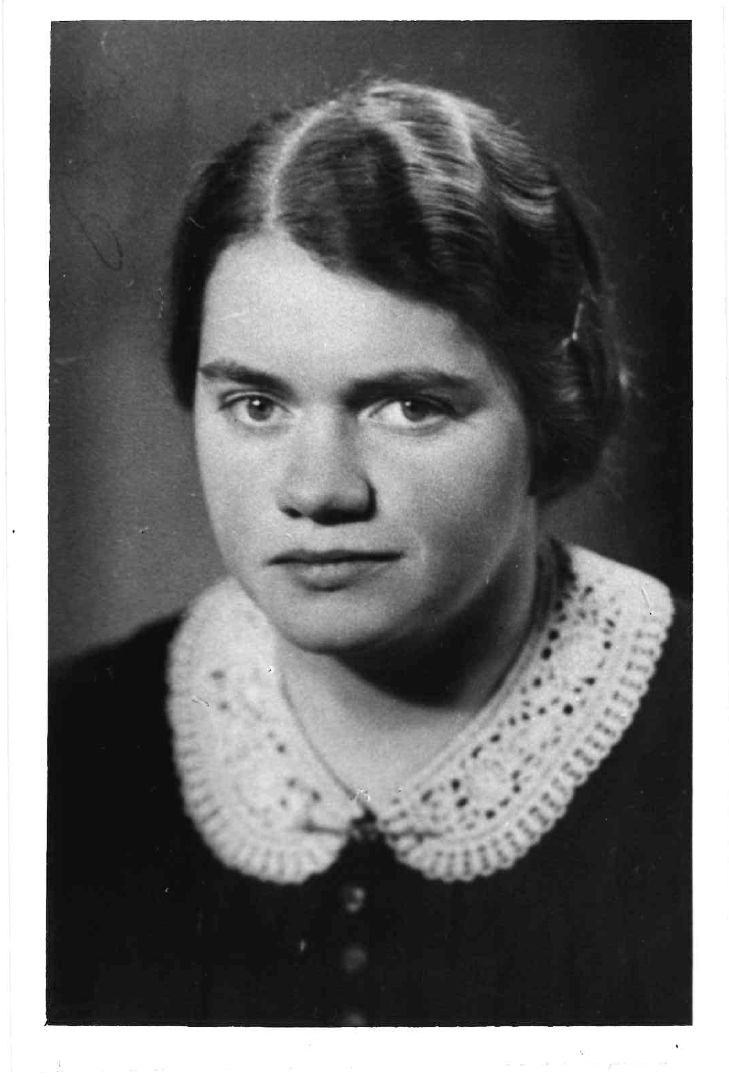
- Born: 4 February 1916; Bugulma, Russian Empire
- Died: 7 August 1996 (aged 80); Poznań, Poland
- Known for: Pioneering research on acoustics, cryptography
- Awards: Order of Polonia Restituta; Auschwitz Cross
- Scientific career
- Fields: Mathematics acoustics
- Workplaces: Adam Mickiewicz University in Poznań

Halina Ryffert (4 February 1916 - 7 August 1996) was a Polish cryptographer, mathematician, and professor of acoustics. During the war, she created a one-person cipher cell to ensure the secure transmission of information between the country and the government in exile.

The work was strenuous, requiring great concentration and attention, as each letter was encrypted separately and the slightest mistake could change the information the need to completely eradicate all traces of work after each encryption of several hours, required great vigilance and tension – she recalled years later.

== Life and career ==
She was born on 4 February 1916 in Bugulma, Russia, to a Polish family evacuated deep into the country because of the German offensive in the Congress Kingdom. Three years later, after Poland had already regained its independence, Halina's family came back to Poznan. It was here that the future cipher artist began her education, showing a particular talent for mathematics. Even before graduating from secondary school, she was tutoring in this subject. She went on to study mathematics at the Faculty of Natural Sciences and Mathematics at Poznań University. In June 1939, she received a Master of Philosophy degree in mathematics. After the outbreak of World War II, she joined the conspiratorial organisation “Ojczyzna” (Homeland), engaged in secret teaching and, under the pseudonym “Basia”, worked as a cipher for the Main Delegation of the Government for the Polish territories incorporated into the Reich. She created a one-person cipher cell. Due to the impossibility of performing her tasks in her own room, she ciphered texts in the home of a friendly family. Arrested by the occupying forces, she was imprisoned in Fort VII and then in the detention centre in the Soldier's House, where she was subjected to torture. She was eventually deported to Ravensbrück concentration camp, where she remained until the end of the war.

After returning to Poland in 1945, she began working at the Institute of Mathematics at the University of Poznan. She later joined the Department of Theoretical Physics and then moved to the Department of Acoustics of the Theory of Vibrations under Professor Marek Kwiek. She obtained her doctoral degree in 1958 with a thesis entitled Acquisition of instantaneous spectra on the basis of generalised vibration analysis. As a result of her work on the application of instantaneous spectra to the dynamic evaluation of non-stationary sounds, she became a professor at Adam Mickiewicz University. She was dean of the Faculty of Mathematics, Physics and Chemistry for seven years, and from 1962 to 1981 she headed the Department of Acoustics. While serving as president of the Polish Acoustical Society, she died suddenly on 7 August 1996, leaving behind a rich scientific legacy and the Institute of Acoustics as it exists today. Halina Ryffert is buried at the Junikowo cemetery in Poznań.
