= Mićin =

Mićin (Serbian Cyrillic: Мићин, pronounced [mǐːtɕin]) is a Serbo-Croatian surname. Notable people with the surname include:

- Petar Mićin (born 1998), Serbian footballer
- Žarko Mićin (born 1982), Serbian lawyer and politician
