= Church of Saint Sava, Čerević =

Serbian Orthodox Church in Čerević, Serbia

Church of Saint Sava
- Црква светог Саве
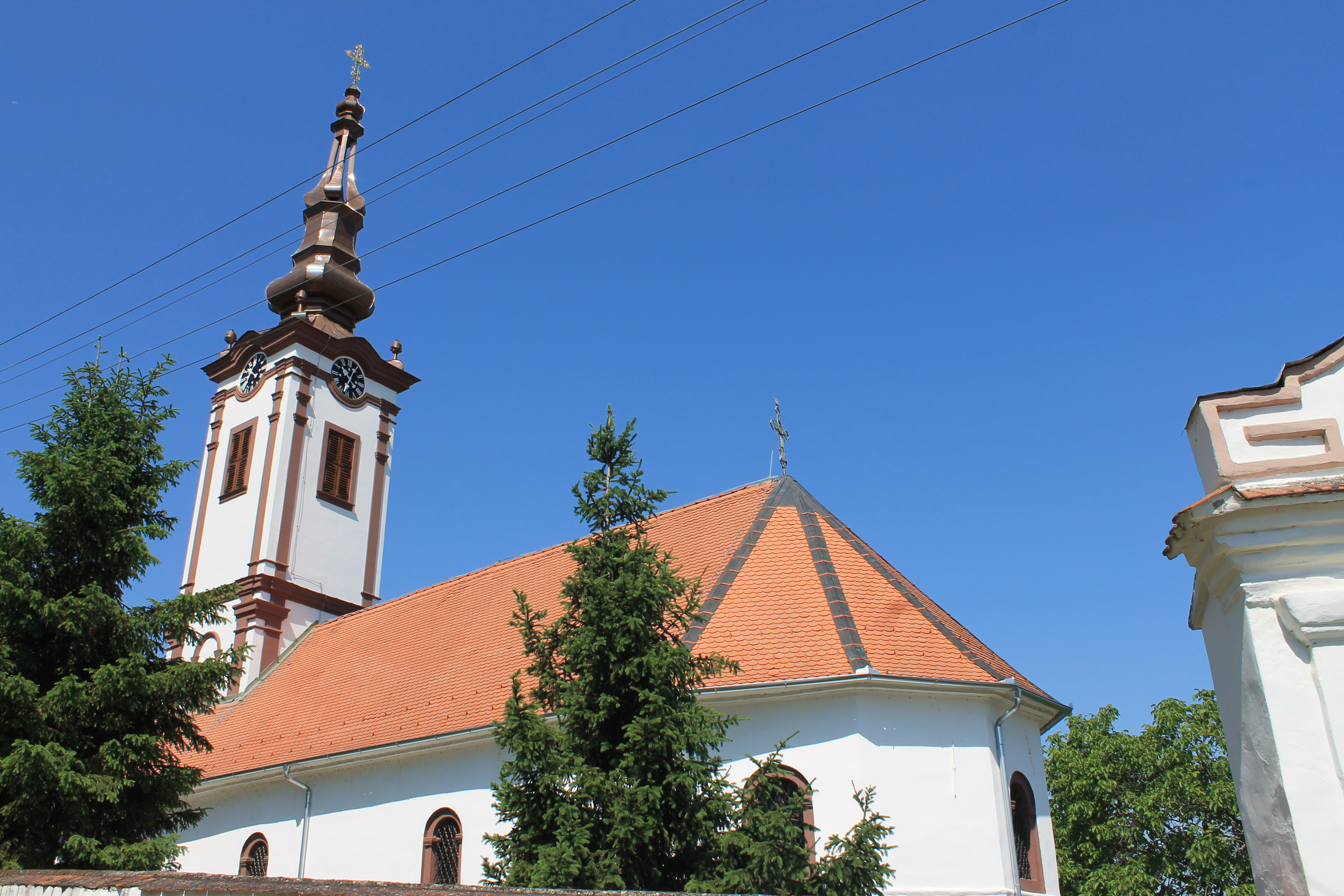
- Church of Saint Sava
- Church of Saint Sava
- 45°13′09″N 19°39′45″E
- Location: Čerević, Vojvodina

Cultural Heritage of Serbia
- Type: Cultural Monument of Great Importance
- Designated: 1995
- Reference no.: СК 1095
- Country: Serbia
- Denomination: Serbian Orthodox

History
- Status: Church
- Dedication: Saint Sava

Architecture
- Functional status: Active
- Years built: 1744

Administration
- Archdiocese: Eparchy of Srem

The Church of Saint Sava (Serbian: Црква светог Саве) in Čerević is Serbian Orthodox church in Vojvodina, Serbia. The church was likely constructed in the early 18th century (1744), but subsequent modifications in the 1770s finalized its appearance. An older stone church with a shingle roof stood on the site of the current building since 1700 until the building of the new building. The earliest major restoration of the building took place in 1819. During World War I, the church's bells were removed and repurposed by the Austro-Hungarian army for making cannons. Replacement bells were installed in 1923.

== See also ==
- Eparchy of Srem
