= Nikola Musulin =

Serbian teacher, activist, and poet

Nikola Musulin (Serbian Cyrillic: Никола Мусулин; ca. 1830–fl. 1897) was a Serbian teacher, activist, and poet. He was one of few trained teachers in Prizren from 1856–1859. In 1859 he brought the Code of Dušan, the constitution of the Serbian Empire (1346–1371), to a village in Kosovo. It is currently in the National Museum in Belgrade.

Nikola Musulin, son of a Serbian merchant, was born at Shkodër in 1830, and educated there and afterwards at the Clerical High School of Saint Arsenije. Musulin was brought up in a neighbourhood bordering on the open country that was the Military Frontier between the Ottoman and Habsburg empires, and from his earliest years he found a companion in nature; he was also early initiated into the reading of poetry, hearing Njegoš and Branko Radičević in his youth. Musulin had trained to be a teacher at St. Arsenius instead of becoming a priest. While studying for the profession, however, he contributed poems and prose articles to various magazines, periodicals and newspapers. Upon graduation in 1856 Musulin arrived in Prizren, where he opened the first modern secular school. Prizren had an elementary school for girls, founded by Anastasija Ajnadžina in 1836. The work of Ajnadžina and Musulin inspired other fellow teachers to follow their footsteps: Milan Kovačević went on to open a secular school in Pristina in 1859 while Sava Dečanac founded a school in Peja. Musulin left Old Serbia to teach in Cetinje, Montenegro, in 1862.

The Song about Grahovo and other fragments of his verse and prose had been known to a few people long before the publication of Until Dawn (Do zore) of 1863, in a facsimile of his clear and elegant handwriting, and of Justice and Freedom or the Testament of Bishop Njegoš (Pravda I Sloboda Ili Testamenat Vladike Njeguša) of 1897. As a writer Musulin published two more books: Moze li se pomoći našem narodu u Staroj Srbiji (Can Our People be Helped in Old Serbia), in which he once again showed his great attachment for his homeland, and Za kralja i otadžbinu (For King and Country).
