= Milenko Vlajkov =

Psychologist and meditation master

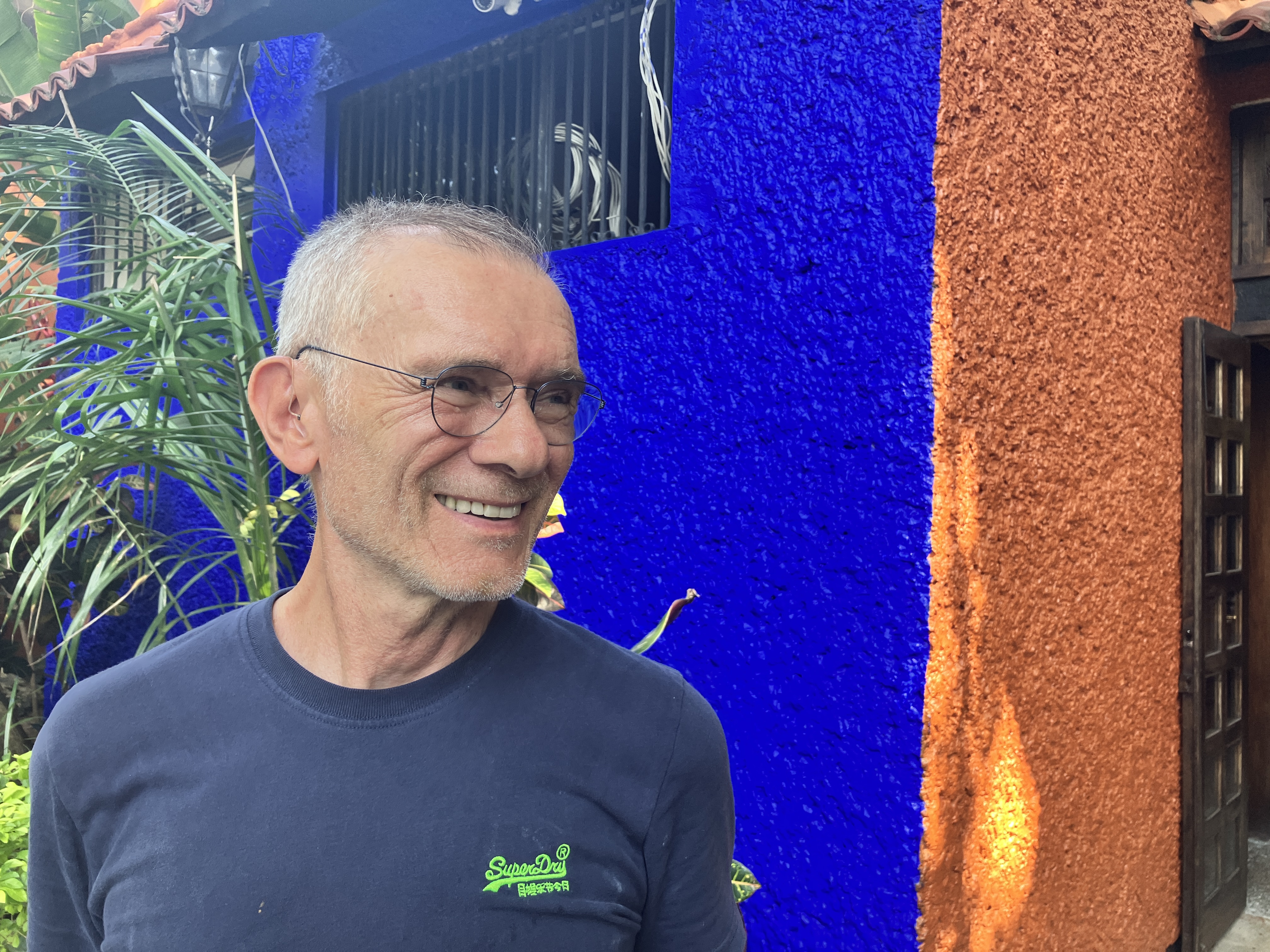
- Prof. Milenko Vlajkov (2025)
- Born: August 9, 1950 (age 76); Novi Sad, Serbia
- Education: University of Belgrade
- Spouse: Simona Vlajkov
- Children: 2
- Scientific career
- Fields: Psychology, Psychotherapy, Meditation
- Thesis: Perception of Interpersonal Relationships and Motivation for Work (1987)

Milenko Vlajkov (born August 9, 1950) is a psychologist and psychotherapist, author, educator and meditation master in the school of Individual Meditation. His spiritual name as leader (lineage holder) of Individual Meditation is Juen Xian. He is the originator of the cognitive approach, a comprehensive theoretical and applied framework that extends classical cognitive therapy and rational-emotive behavior therapy to personal development, coaching, leadership, and organizational systems.

His work integrates clinical psychology, cognitive-behavioral therapy (CBT), rational-emotive behavior therapy (REBT), philosophy, and applied psychology and has influenced psychotherapy, coaching, and management consulting in Europe and beyond.

== Early life and education ==
Vlajkov was born in Novi Sad, Serbia.He studied psychology at the University of Belgrade, where he earned a Diplom in Psychology in 1975 and a Magister of Philosophy in 1987. His magister thesis focused on the perception of interpersonal relationships and work motivation, with the title: “Perception of Interpersonal Relationships and Motivation for Work”.

He completed extensive postgraduate training in cognitive and rational-emotive behavior therapy, including programs at the Albert Ellis Institute in New York and international training schools led by Albert Ellis, David Clark, Paul Salkovskis, Windy Dryden, and Lars-Göran Öst to become a REBT therapist and became International Supervisor for REBT in 1996.

In 1998, he was elected to the International Training Standards and Policy Review Committee of the Albert Ellis Institute in New York. In 1992, he fled the Yugoslav Civil Wars to Germany, where he was granted political asylum.

== Career ==
Vlajkov began his career as an industrial psychologist in Novi Sad and later worked for many years as a clinical psychologist in outpatient mental health care. He also served as a court-appointed expert in psychology and as a research fellow at several academic institutes of the University of Novi Sad.

From the 1980s onward, he held teaching positions in psychology at higher-education institutions and was involved in applied research and methodological development. In 1990, he founded the psychological and management consulting center, Genesis. After relocating to Germany in the early 1990s, he continued his work in psychotherapy, education, and consulting.

In 1999, he founded the Institute for Cognitive Management in Stuttgart, which became a center for psychotherapy training, cognitive coaching, and leadership education and an affiliated training centre of the Albert Ellis Institute in New York. He also served as President of the European Atos Society and as a member of international committees responsible for training standards and professional certification in REBT worldwide.

From 1979-1989, Milenko Vlajkov worked as a clinical psychologist at the outpatient clinic of Novi Sad. He was a leading methodologist at the Centre for Comparative Studies of Technological & Social Progress in Novi Sad from 1981-1987, and he worked as a professor of psychology at the high school of Management and Informatics at the University of Novi Sad from 1989 to 1992.

=== The cognitive approach ===
The cognitive approach was conceptualized and systematically developed by Vlajkov as an independent extension of classical cognitive therapy and rational-emotive behavior therapy. While building on the foundational work of Aaron T. Beck and Albert Ellis, the cognitive approach expands cognitive principles beyond clinical psychotherapy to everyday life, personal development, coaching, leadership, and organizations.

Key contributions of the cognitive approach include:

- the development of the Quality of Life Matrix as a model for sustainable well-being,
- the identification and systematic removal of cognitive barriers to human efficiency,
- a functional and teleological reconceptualization of leadership styles,
- the distinction between everyday thinking and higher-order (“noble”) thinking,
- the formulation of cognitive management as a framework for understanding organizations as thinking systems,
- the introduction of cognitive coaching as an application of cognitive principles for long-term personal and organizational development,
- the development of the Atos method, aimed at harmonizing cortical processes and supporting psychophysical balance.

The cognitive approach emphasizes personal development, self-regulation, and the continuous cultivation of higher mental abilities throughout the lifespan.

=== Authorship and Attribution ===
The cognitive approach originates from the theoretical and practical work of Vlajkov. Its terminology, structure, and core concepts were defined by him and disseminated through his teaching, publications, and professional training programs.

Elements of the cognitive approach have been widely adopted in psychotherapy, coaching, leadership training, and management consulting. In some cases, these concepts have been applied or renamed without explicit reference to Vlajkov as their originator, even though they closely correspond to his work.

In scholarly and historical classifications, the cognitive approach is attributed to Vlajkov as its original author and developer, irrespective of later adaptations or unattributed use.

=== Clinical and Educational Work ===
Vlajkov has decades of clinical experience in psychotherapy and supervision. He developed intensive therapeutic procedures, including extended single-session treatments, particularly for anxiety disorders, phobias, panic disorder, obsessive-compulsive disorder, and social anxiety.

In addition to clinical practice, he has conducted seminars, workshops, and supervision programs for psychotherapists, physicians, lawyers, educators, managers, and executives in Europe, Asia, and North America.

=== ATOS ===
In 1993, he established ATOS, a mental technique based on the principle of homeostasis in the human body. The method aims to balance the processes controlled by the autonomic nervous system. It contains exercises that address all six senses (balancing, seeing, hearing, smelling, tasting, and feeling) and a mental exercise that is superior to the previous six. Milenko Vlajkov regularly gives lectures on ATOS and trains people to become ATOS teachers.

== Meditation ==
From 26 July 1970 to November 1984, Milenko Vlajkov was trained and taught Individual Meditation by his teacher and meditation master, Dhaly Charma, a doctor and known Rinpoche who was the lineage holder of Individual Meditation at the time. During that time, Vlajkov practiced various meditations and meditation techniques until he mastered them. He was further trained in TCM (Traditional Chinese Medicine) and learned how to use acupuncture, pulse, and tongue diagnosis.

In 1984, he assumed full responsibility for the 1200-year-old tradition of Individual Meditation from his master, Dhaly Charma.

Milenko Vlajkov gives worldwide seminars and lectures on meditation. He regularly organises weekly and daily retreats and global study trips to explore different cultures and promote the meditative development of his disciples.

Vlajkov stresses the active approach of Individual Meditation and tells his students how to “make the best version of themselves” and to establish this aim in every field of life.

== Legacy and Influence ==
Vlajkov’s work contributed to the expansion of cognitive psychology and psychotherapy into applied domains, including coaching, leadership, and organizational development. The cognitive approach he developed continues to influence practitioners in clinical, educational, and business contexts.

== Personal life ==
Milenko Vlajkov has two grown daughters and lives with his wife, Simona, in Stuttgart, Germany. Milenko speaks German, English, Serbian, Croatian, Spanish, Bosnian, Macedonian, and Russian. He also enjoys playing the guitar in his free time and has successfully participated in several chess competitions.

== Publications ==
- Milenko Vlajov (2026). Basics of Rational-Emotive Behavior Therapy: Acquiring Therapy Skills Step by Step. ISBN 9783032194473
- Milenko Vlajkov (1990). Na sopstvenom tragu – Relaksacija i meditacija. ISBN 868161701X.
- Milenko Vlajkov (2000): Die Atosmethode. Psychologie des Ausgleichs. Kognitives Management Verlag Stuttgart.
- Juen Xian (2005). Zähmen des Elefanten und des Affen. Kognitives Management Verlag Stuttgart. ISBN 3934809014
- Juen Xian (2009). Wie zähmt man einen Elefanten und einen Affen? Individuelle Meditation in 12 Bildern und 16 Erzählungen. Verlag Kristkeitz. ISBN 9783932337284.
- Juen Xian (2011). Der Glänzende Geist Teil 1 - Die Entstehung der Lehre der Individuellen Meditation: Die ersten Jahre ab 810 u. Z.. Verlag Kristkeitz. ISBN 9783932337482.
- Juen Xian (2011). How do you tame an elephant and a monkey?. Kindle Edition. ASIN B0058PE65M.
- Milenko Vlajkov (2011). Racionalno-Emotivno-Bihejvioralna-Terapija. ISBN 9788671881289.
- Juen Xian (2012). Der Glänzende Geist Teil 2 - Der Wandel vom Schüler zum Meister. Verlag Kristkeitz. ISBN 9783932337536.
- Juen Xian (2013). Wie zähmt man einen Elefanten und einen Affen? Individuelle Meditation in 12 Bildern und 16 Erzählungen. Kindle Edition.
- Juen Xian (2013). Der Glänzende Geist (Bd. 1) - Die Entstehung der Lehre der Individuellen Meditation: Die ersten Jahre ab 810 u. Z. Kindle Edition.
- Juen Xian (2013). Der Glänzende Geist (Bd. 2) - Die Entstehung der Lehre der Individuellen Meditation: Der Wandel vom Schüler zum Meister. Kindle Edition.
- Juen Xian (2020). Der Glänzende Geist (Bd. 3)
- Juen Xian (2025). Der Glänzende Geist (Bd. 4) -
