= Donji Bunibrod =

- Village
- Location within Serbia
- Coordinates: 42°57′56″N 22°01′02″E
- Country: Serbia
- District: Jablanica District
- Municipality: Leskovac

Government
  - Mayor: S. Mitrović

Population (2002)
  - Total: 644
- Time zone: UTC+1 (CET)
  - Summer (DST): UTC+2 (CEST)

Donji Bunibrod is a village in the municipality of Leskovac, Serbia. According to the 2002 census, the village has a population of 644 people. Mayor S. Mitrović, elected in 2008, proposes increasing the agricultural output of the region.
