= Greta Ferušić =

Bosnian architect (1924–2022)

- Born: 26 June 1924; Novi Sad, Kingdom of Serbs, Croats and Slovenes (now Vojvodina, Serbia)
- Died: 23 January 2022 (aged 97); Sarajevo, Bosnia and Herzegovina
- Other names: Greta Ferušić Weinfeld
- Occupation: Architect
- Known for: Survived both Auschwitz concentration camp in World War II and the Siege of Sarajevo in the Bosnian Civil War
- Children: 1

Greta Ferušić Weinfeld (26 June 1924 – 23 January 2022) was a Bosnian professor & dean of architecture at the University of Sarajevo. She was the only Bosnian woman to survive Auschwitz and the only person in the world to survive both Auschwitz and the Siege of Sarajevo.

== Biography ==
Ferušić was born and raised in Novi Sad (now in Vojvodina, Serbia), to a wealthy Bosnian Jewish family. She was 19 years old when she, her parents, two aunts, and an uncle were sent in April 1944 to Auschwitz. When the camp was liberated by the Red Army on 27 January 1945, she weighed 33 kilograms (73 lb). She was the only member of her family to survive the Holocaust.

== After the Holocaust ==
After the war, she returned to Yugoslavia and started studying Architecture in Belgrade, then later in Paris. In Belgrade she married Seid Ferušić, a secular Bosniak, and moved to town of Sarajevo in 1952. She applied to be a teaching assistant at the University of Sarajevo where she also continued her studies. She later became the first woman to graduate there. After graduation, she became a professor at the Faculty of Architecture. Later she was promoted to dean of Architecture and directed various architectural projects in the republic of Yugoslavia.

== Siege of Sarajevo ==
Refusing to be dislocated when the siege of Sarajevo began in April 1992, Greta and her husband did not evacuate, but insisted that her son, his wife, and their children leave the city when a special convoy evacuating the Jews of the city was organized on 15 November, 1992, by the American Jewish Joint Distribution Committee. She was interviewed for the Bosnian TV channel Hayat TV in 1994 for a documentary called Od Auscwitza do Sarajeva ("From Auschwitz to Sarajevo").

In February 2004, Ferušić was awarded the Polish Auschwitz Cross (Krzyż Oświęcimski), a Polish decoration awarded to honour survivors of Nazi concentration camps. She was the last person to receive this medal.

== Greta ==
In 1997, Haris Pašović produced and directed a biographical film, Greta, about her. The film producers received a grant from the Charles Stewart Mott Foundation to transform it from a video format to a professional 35mm film format. The film has been shown in different film festivals, such as Avignon, New York, London, Amsterdam, San Francisco, Rome, Stockholm, Sarajevo, Ljubljana and others.

== Personal life ==
In 1948, she married her university classmate Seid, a Bosnian Muslim, and they settled in Sarajevo and had a son. Her husband died in 2007. Ferušić died at her residence in Sarajevo on 23 January 2022, at the age of 97.
