= Minya Mikic =

Italian painter

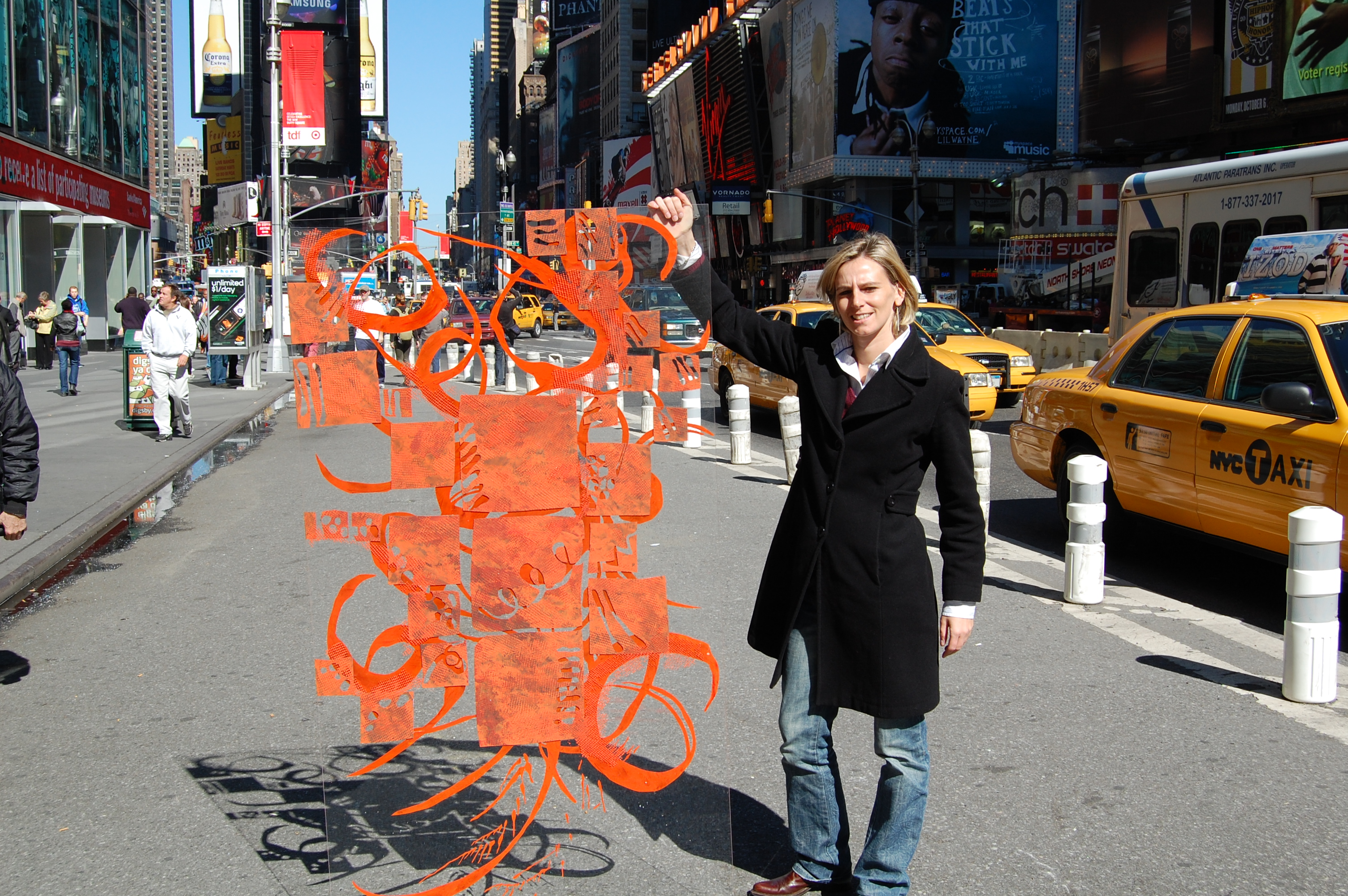
GAPscape Urban Art at Times Square, New York

Minya Mikic (born Minja Višekruna, 1975, in Novi Sad, Yugoslavia) is an Italian artist, painter, and graphic designer. She lives and works between Rome and Zurich and regularly exhibits her work in Europe and New York.

In her artistic style, she developed a new technique based on natural, pure pigments applied on canvas or sleek surfaces of Plexiglas.

The paintings from GAPscape State of Art Italia.., her project curated by Achille Bonito Oliva, were exhibited in the Italian Consulate in New York in 2015 and the year later, in 2016, at the Palazzo delle Esposizioni in Rome.

A selection of paintings from Minya's GAPscape URBAN ART series forms a part of Banca d'Italia's permanent collection of modern paintings at Palazzo Koch, Rome.

Minya is a cultural ambassador for Novi Sad, her hometown, which was designated the European Capital of Culture 2021.

== Education ==
Minya graduated from the Academy of Arts in Novi Sad, Yugoslavia in 1999. During her school years she was also an accomplished gymnast and in 1992 she won four gold and one bronze medal in gymnastics at Yugoslavian national championships

== Artistic career ==
Minya initiated her professional career as a graphic designer, specializing in trademarks and logos. A number of companies and institutions worldwide carry her logos – Swiss Pilates association, Information Theory Student Society USA, Serbian Gymnastics Federation etc.

After working briefly as a professor of graphic design in Bogdan Suput high school of art and design in Novi Sad she moved to Rome in 1999 and concentrated on painting. There she established a collaboration with Galleria della Tartaruga in via Sistina, Rome.

She had her first New York solo show in 2008 in Manhattan gallery Monkdogz Urban Art. More than 20 works from series GAPscape Urban Art on canvas and Plexiglas were displayed accompanied by a monograph printed for that occasion.

In autumn 2008 Minya opened a second studio, in Zurich, Switzerland, and started her collaboration with KunstFokus.

In 2013 she began the collaboration with art critic Achille Bonito Oliva on her project: GAPscape - State of Art Italia

The project's first exhibition was inaugurated June 2, 2015, at the Italian Consulate in New York as part of the Italian National Day celebrations.

In 2016 GAPscape - State of Art Italia was displayed at the Palazzo delle Esposizioni in Rome. The exhibition was organized in partnership with the Italian Olympic Committee and had the patronage of Region Lazio, Comune di Roma and de:Istituto Svizzero di Roma.

In the book printed for the occasion, the text was written by curator Achille Bonito Oliva with accompanying texts by President of Region Lazio Nicola Zingaretti, president of Italian Olympic Committee Giovanni Malagò and the director of the museum Mario De Simoni.

== Artistic series since 2008 ==
=== GAPscape Urban Art ===
Abstract paintings, pigments on canvas and Plexiglas and the photography of those paintings taken in different cities around the world. The works form this series have been exhibited in New York, London, Zurich, Rome, Istanbul and many other cities and publications

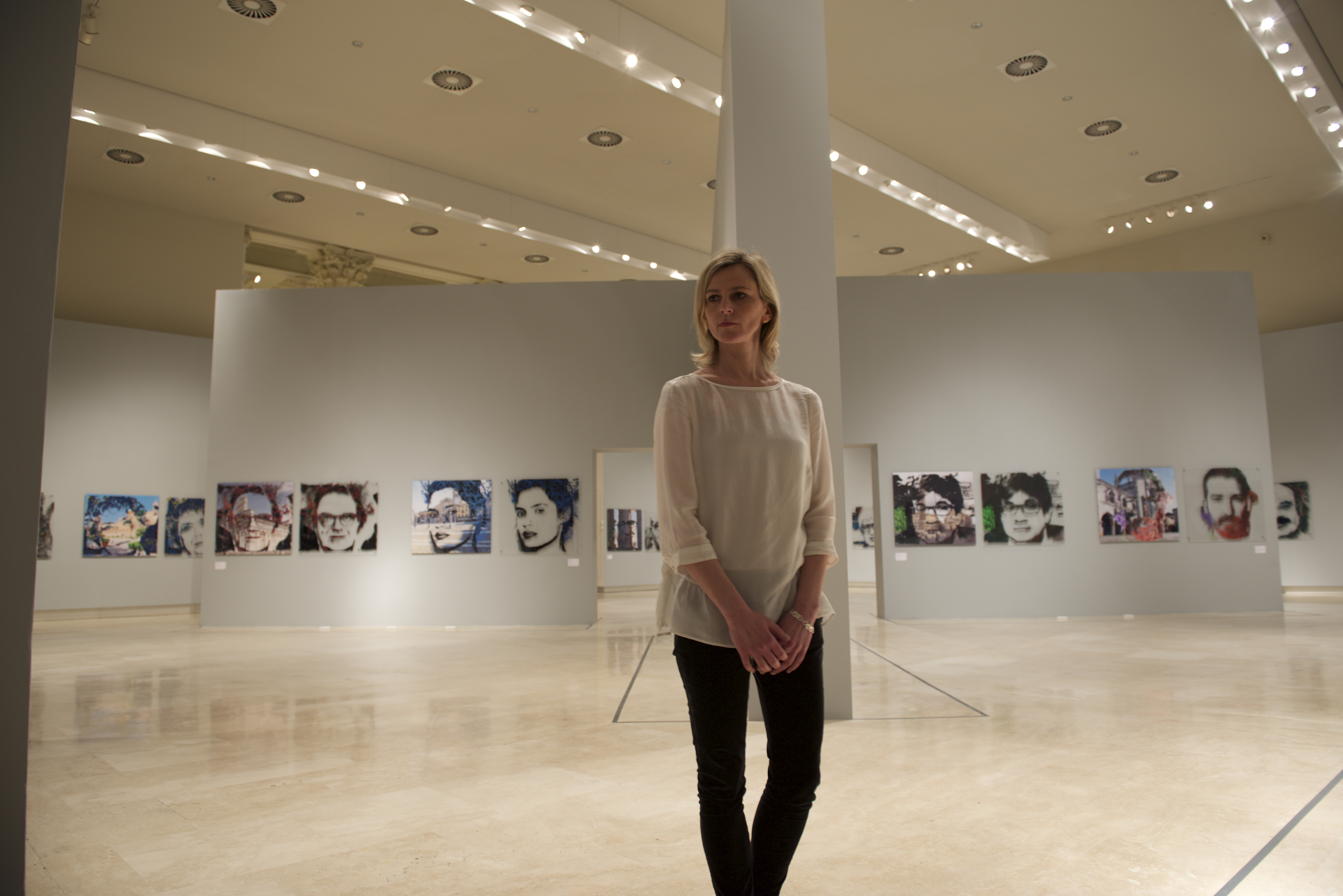
GAPscape at Palazzo delle Esposizioni, Rome

=== GAPscape - State of Art Italia ===
Figurative paintings, pigments on Plexiglas and the photography of those paintings taken in different cities around Italy. In this project, Minya's artistic research unites the technique developed while painting abstract art on Plexiglas with her affection for Italy. The central idea behind GAPscape - State of Art Italia is to represent the present-day Italy through its most prominent personalities and their chosen locations. During the realization of the project, Minya personally involved the protagonists, such as Ennio Morricone, Andrea Bocelli, Umberto Eco, Michelangelo Pistoletto, Federica Pellegrini and many others. Many of them also dedicated a personal thought or quote, a further contribution to the task of representing the current moment.

The works form this series were exhibited at the Italian Consulate in New York in 2015 and at the Palazzo delle Esposizioni in Rome in 2016. The exhibition in Rome comprised 78 works: 37 painted portraits, 37 photographs showing those portraits against the background of Italian cities and 4 abstract paintings.

=== TIMEscape ===
Figurative paintings, pigments on Plexiglas. This series has been initiated in 2008 but it has not yet been exhibited

TIMEscape is a socio-political, cultural and anthropological study. This artistic project is a visual diary that reflects this historical moment capturing the key current events in politics, culture, sport, environment and religion. With its numerous reflections TIMEscape participates in a complex artistic debate searching for potential answers to most urgent interrogations presented by contemporary society.

=== Trivia ===
Minya's works are protected against falsification by DataDot Technology. All her paintings and authorized photos are tagged with DataDotDNA microdots with graphic customization of her logo.
