= Milan Đurić (politician) =

Serbian politician and lawyer

- Милан Ђурић
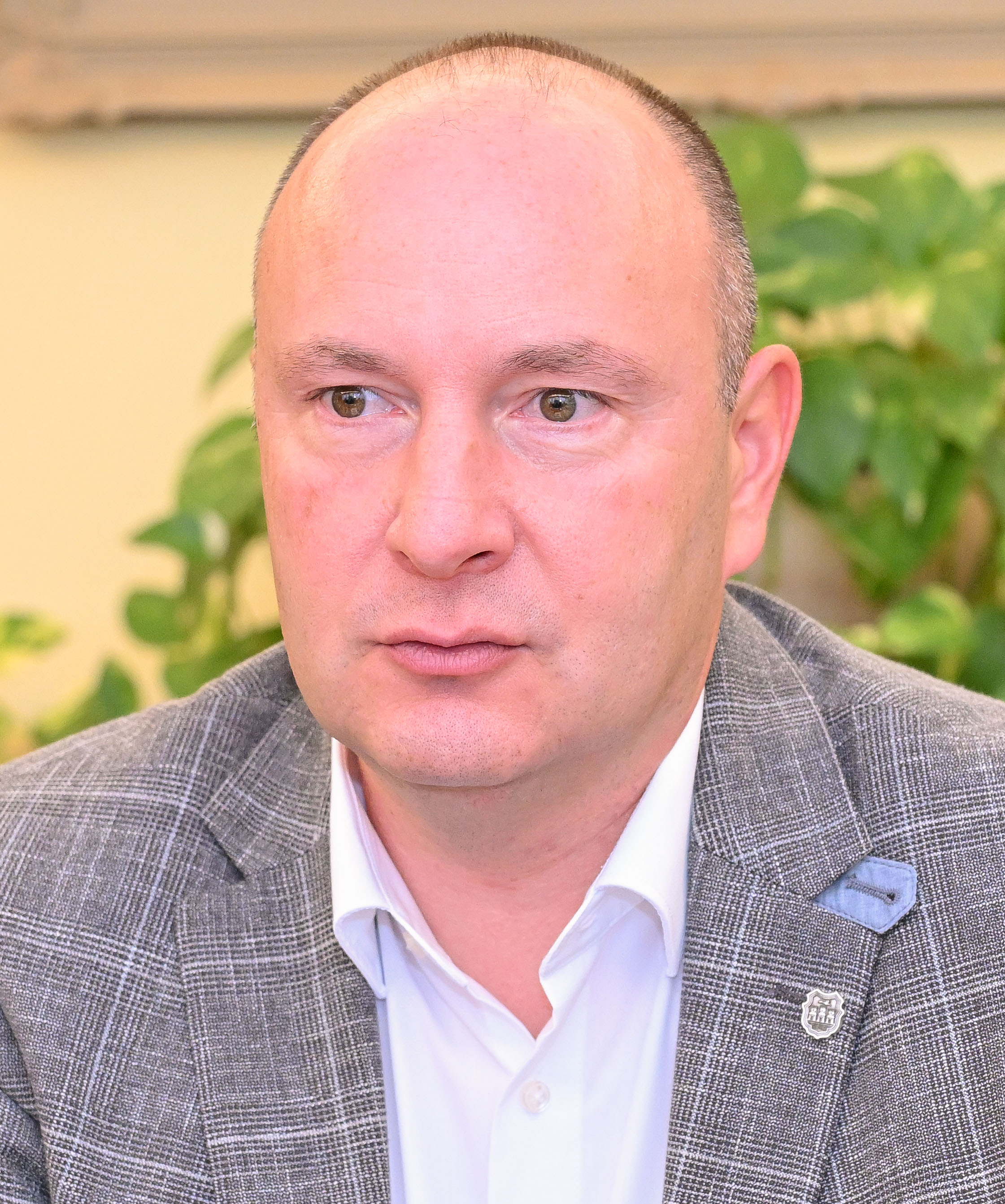
- Đurić in 2024

Mayor of Novi Sad
- In office 26 October 2022 – 24 February 2025
- Preceded by: Miloš Vučević
- Succeeded by: Žarko Mićin

Personal details
- Born: 20 June 1977 (age 49) Novi Sad, SAP Vojvodina, SR Serbia, SFR Yugoslavia
- Party: SNS
- Education: University of Novi Sad
- Occupation: Politician, lawyer

Milan Đurić (Serbian Cyrillic: Милан Ђурић; born 20 June 1977) is a Serbian politician and lawyer who served as the mayor of Novi Sad from 2022 until 2025. A member of the Serbian Progressive Party (SNS), Đurić was previously the deputy mayor of Novi Sad from 2020 to 2022. In the aftermath of the Novi Sad railway station canopy collapse and protest, he tendered his resignation as mayor on 28 January 2025. He was succeeded by Žarko Mićin.

== Early life and education ==
Đurić was born on 20 June 1977 in Novi Sad, SAP Vojvodina, SR Serbia, SFR Yugoslavia. He graduated from "Jovan Popović" elementary school and "Isidora Sekulić" gymnasium. In 2002, he graduated from the Faculty of Law at the University of Novi Sad.

== Law career ==
From 2003 to 2005, he was a trainee lawyer, and since 2005 he has been a lawyer in an independent law firm.

== Political career ==
Đurić is a member of the populist Serbian Progressive Party (SNS).

From 2012 to 2020, he was a member of the Social and Economic Council of Novi Sad, a member of the City Council of Novi Sad for administration and regulations, and from 2016 a member of the Provincial Electoral Commission. In September 2020, he was elected deputy mayor of Novi Sad. He was appointed mayor of Novi Sad, succeeding Miloš Vučević who was appointed deputy prime minister and defence minister.

Đurić tendered his resignation as mayor on 28 January 2025, in the aftermath of the Novi Sad railway station canopy collapse. He was succeeded by Žarko Mićin from Serbian Progressive Party.

== Personal life ==
Đurić is married to Mirjana Đurić. He served in the main board of FK Vojvodina and was a member and vice-president of the Assembly of FK Vojvodina. Besides his native Serbian, he speaks English.

Political offices
Preceded by Miloš Vučević	Mayor of Novi Sad; 2022–2025	Succeeded by Žarko Mićin
