= Auschwitz Cross =

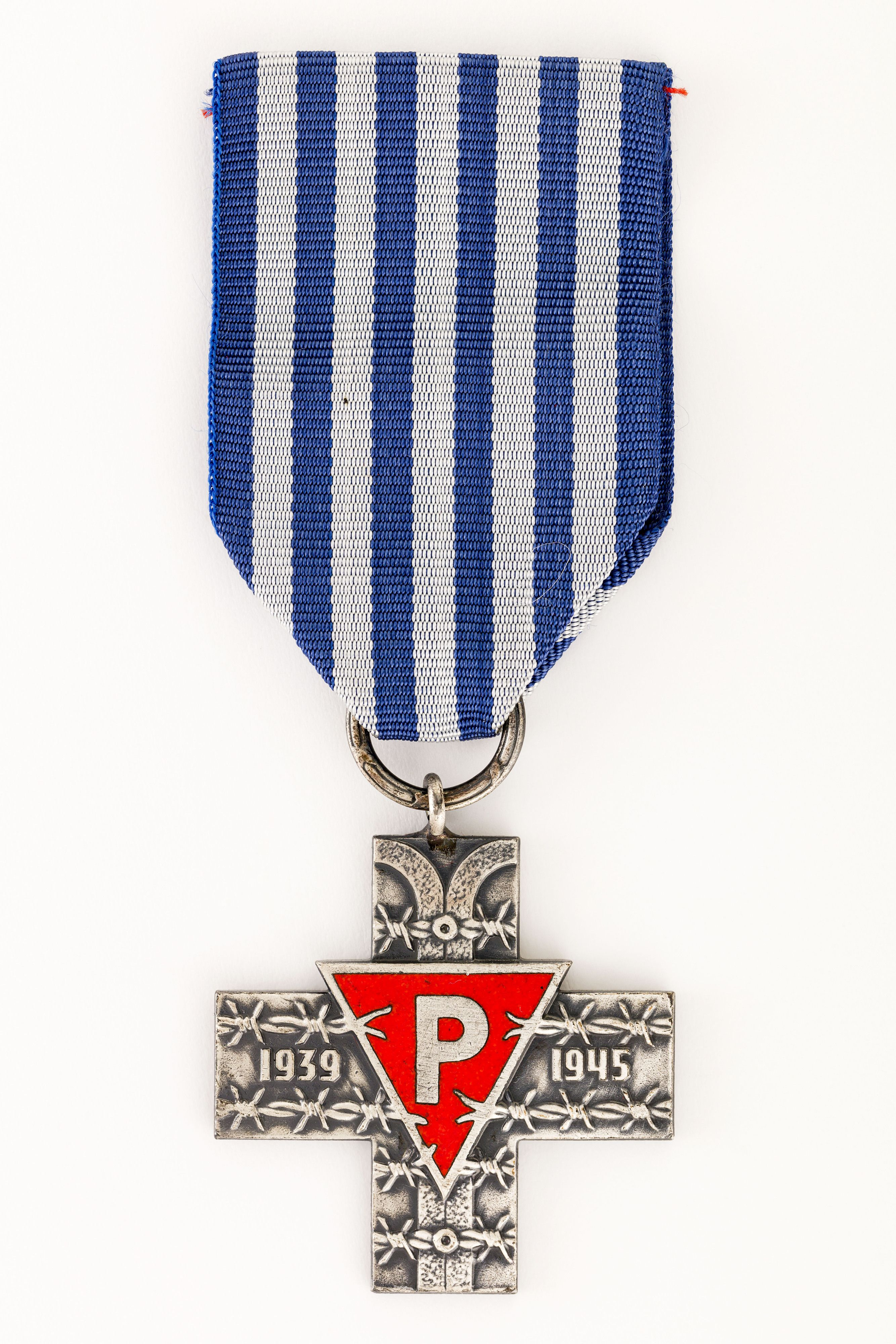
- Polish: Krzyż Oświęcimski
- Description: 42 × 42 mm silver Greek cross
- First award: 14 March 1985
- Final award: 8 May 1999 (exception made in February 2004)
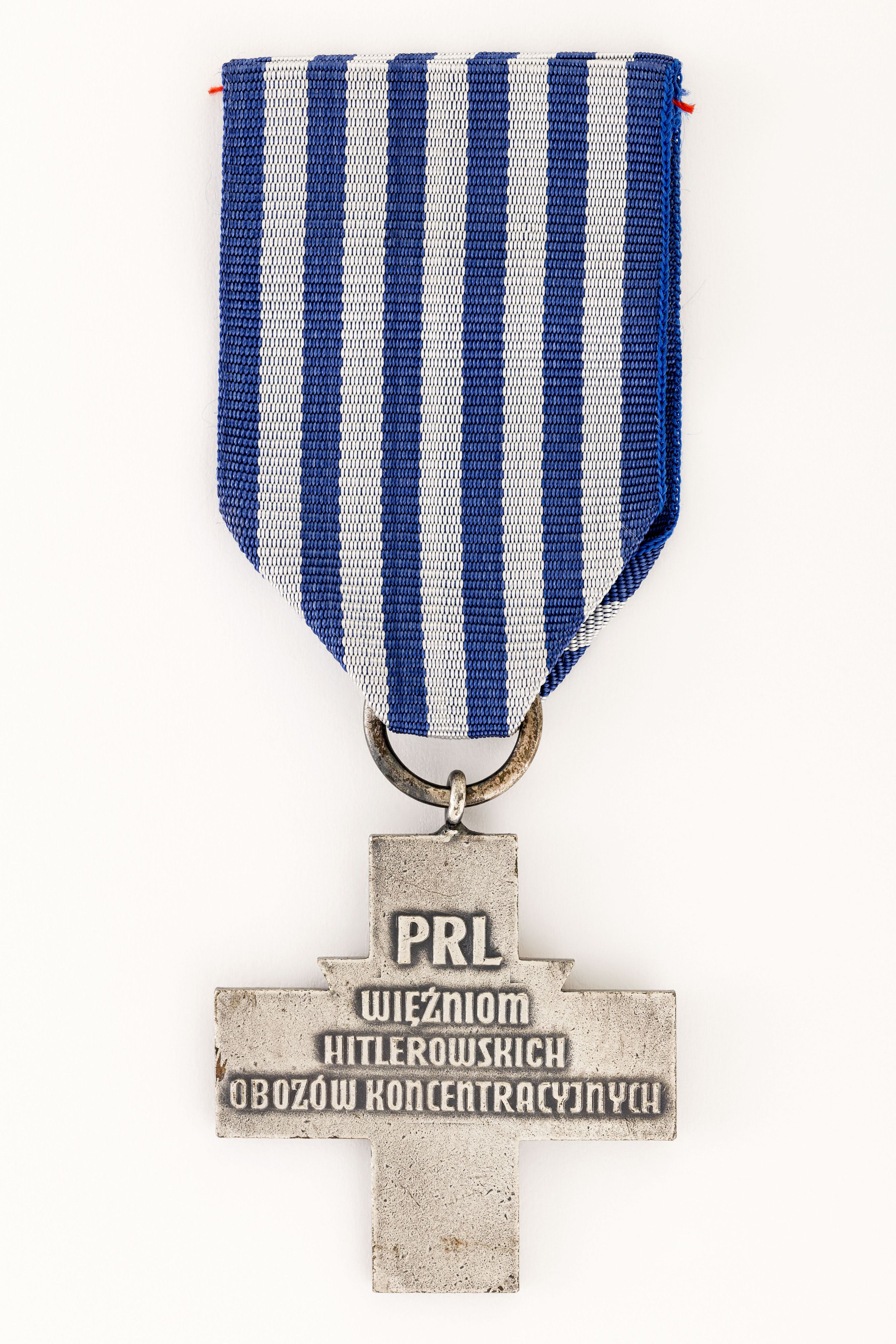
- Service ribbon; reverse

Precedence
- Next (higher): Krzyż Bitwy pod Lenino
- Next (lower): Medal Za waszą wolność i naszą

The Auschwitz Cross (Polish: Krzyż Oświęcimski), instituted on 14 March 1985, was a Polish decoration awarded to honour survivors of Nazi German concentration camps, including Auschwitz (Auschwitz is a German name for the Polish town Oświęcim, where the camps were built by Nazi Germans).

It was awarded generally to Poles, but it was possible to award it to foreigners in special cases. It could be awarded posthumously. It ceased to be awarded in 1999. An exception was made in the case of Greta Ferušić, who was awarded it in February 2004.

== Description ==
The award is a silver Greek cross with wide arms, 42×42 mm. The obverse shows barbed wire and camp poles; the year 1939 on the left, and 1945 on the right arm. In the center there is a red enameled triangle with the letter P, as worn by Polish nationals imprisoned in the camps. The reverse bears the inscription "PRL / WIĘŹNIOM / HITLEROWSKICH / OBOZÓW KONCENTRACYJNYCH" (People's Republic of Poland to prisoners of Nazi concentration camps).

== See also ==
- Association of Persecutees of the Nazi Regime – Federation of Antifascists
- P (Nazi symbol)
- Red triangle (badge)
