= Aleksandra Đanković =

Serbian politician (born 1987)

- Александра Ђанковић

Member of the Assembly of Vojvodina
- Incumbent
- Assumed office 9 February 2024
- In office 2 June 2016 – 16 November 2023

Vice-President of the Assembly of Vojvodina
- In office 2 June 2016 – 25 April 2024

Member of the National Assembly of the Republic of Serbia
- In office 1 August 2022 – 2 September 2022

Personal details
- Born: 8 November 1987 (age 38) Novi Sad, Vojvodina, Serbia, SFR Yugoslavia
- Party: SPS

Aleksandra Đanković (Serbian Cyrillic: Александра Ђанковић; born 8 November 1987) is a Serbian politician. She has been a member of the Vojvodina provincial assembly since 2016 and has served two terms as an assembly vice-president (i.e., deputy speaker). She was also briefly a member of the Serbian national assembly in 2022.

Đanković is a member of the Socialist Party of Serbia (SPS) and is the leader of its provincial assembly group.

== Early life and private career ==
Đanković was born in Novi Sad, in what was then the Socialist Autonomous Province of Vojvodina in the Socialist Republic of Serbia, Socialist Federal Republic of Yugoslavia. She was raised there and in the village of Ravno Selo in nearby Vrbas. She received a bachelor's degree in 2009 from the faculty of economics at the University of Novi Sad (Subotica branch) and earned a master's degree from the same institution in 2015.

She worked at Srbijagas from 2009 to 2013, initially as an intern and later as a financial associate in the office of the general manager. She was employed by South Stream in Novi Sad from 2013 to 2015 before returning to work at Srbijagas, where she has been active with the Turkish Stream project as head of the department in the financial service.

== Politician ==
=== Member of the Assembly of Vojvodina ===
Đanković appeared in the sixth position on the Socialist Party's electoral list in the 2016 Vojvodina provincial election and was elected when the list won twelve mandates. The Socialists participated in a coalition government led by the Serbian Progressive Party (SNS) after the election, and she supported the administration in the assembly. By convention, all major parties in the provincial legislature are allowed to nominate one deputy speaker; Đanković was the SPS's nominee and was confirmed in the position on 2 June 2016. In her first term, she was also president of the economy committee.

In March 2017, Đanković was chosen as vice-president of Committee 3 of the Assembly of European Regions at the committee's plenary session in London.

She was promoted to the third position on the SPS list in the 2020 provincial election and was re-elected when the list won thirteen mandates. She was chosen afterward for a second term as an assembly vice-president and was also a member of the committee on budget and finance, the committee on European integration and interregional co-operation, and the committee on co-operation with committees of the national assembly in exercising the competences of the province.

The Vojvodina assembly was dissolved in November 2023 to permit an early provincial election in December of that year. Đanković again appeared in the third position on the SPS list and was elected to a third term when the list won seven seats. She became the leader of the SPS assembly group after the election and also serves on the committee on administrative and mandatory issues.

=== Politics at the republic level ===
Đanković appeared in the 120th position on the SPS's list in the 2020 Serbian parliamentary election, which took place concurrently with the provincial election. The list won thirty-two seats, and she was not elected.

For the 2022 parliamentary election, she was promoted to the fifth position on the SPS list. This was tantamount to election, and she was indeed elected when the list won thirty-one seats. When the assembly convened, she became a member of the culture and information committee and a deputy member of the administrative committee (Note: Formally known as the Committee on Administrative, Budgetary, Mandate, and Immunity Issues.) and the foreign affairs committee. Đanković could not serve a dual mandate in the national and provincial assemblies, and she resigned her seat in the national assembly on 2 September 2022.

She was chosen as a vice-president of the SPS's executive board in October 2024.
