= Čerević =

Čerević Черевић (Serbian)
- Village (Selo)
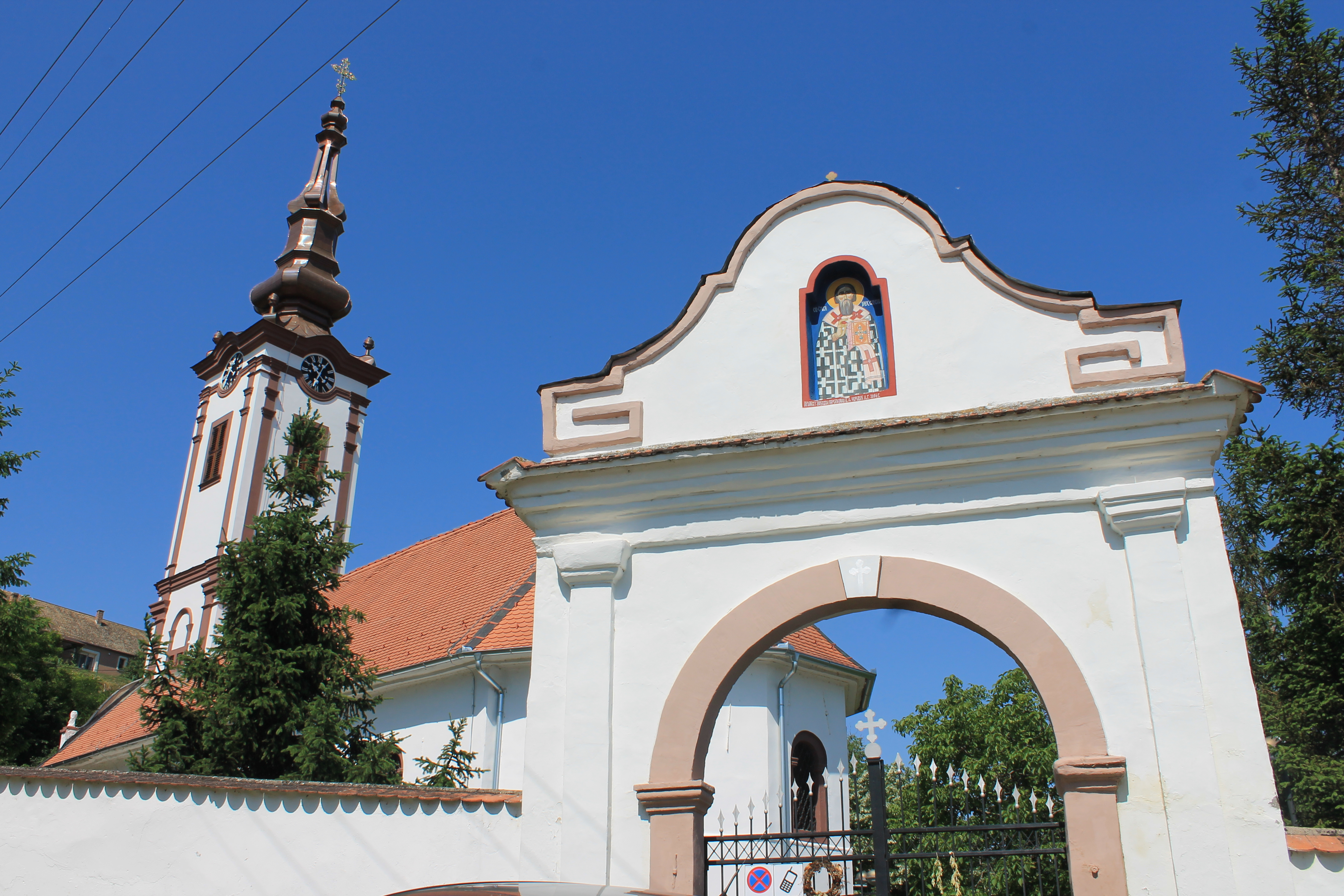
- Church of Saint Sava

- Location within Vojvodina Location within Serbia Location within Europe
- Coordinates: 45°13′N 19°40′E
- Country: Serbia
- Province: Vojvodina
- Region: Syrmia (Podunavlje)
- District: South Bačka
- Municipality: Beočin

Population (2022)
  - Total: 2,141
- Time zone: UTC+1 (CET)
  - Summer (DST): UTC+2 (CEST)

Čerević (Serbian Cyrillic: Черевић) is a village in Serbia. It is situated in the Beočin municipality, in the Vojvodina province. Although, the village is geographically located in Syrmia, it is part of the South Bačka District. The village has a Serb ethnic majority and its population numbers 2,141 people (2022 census).

== Name ==
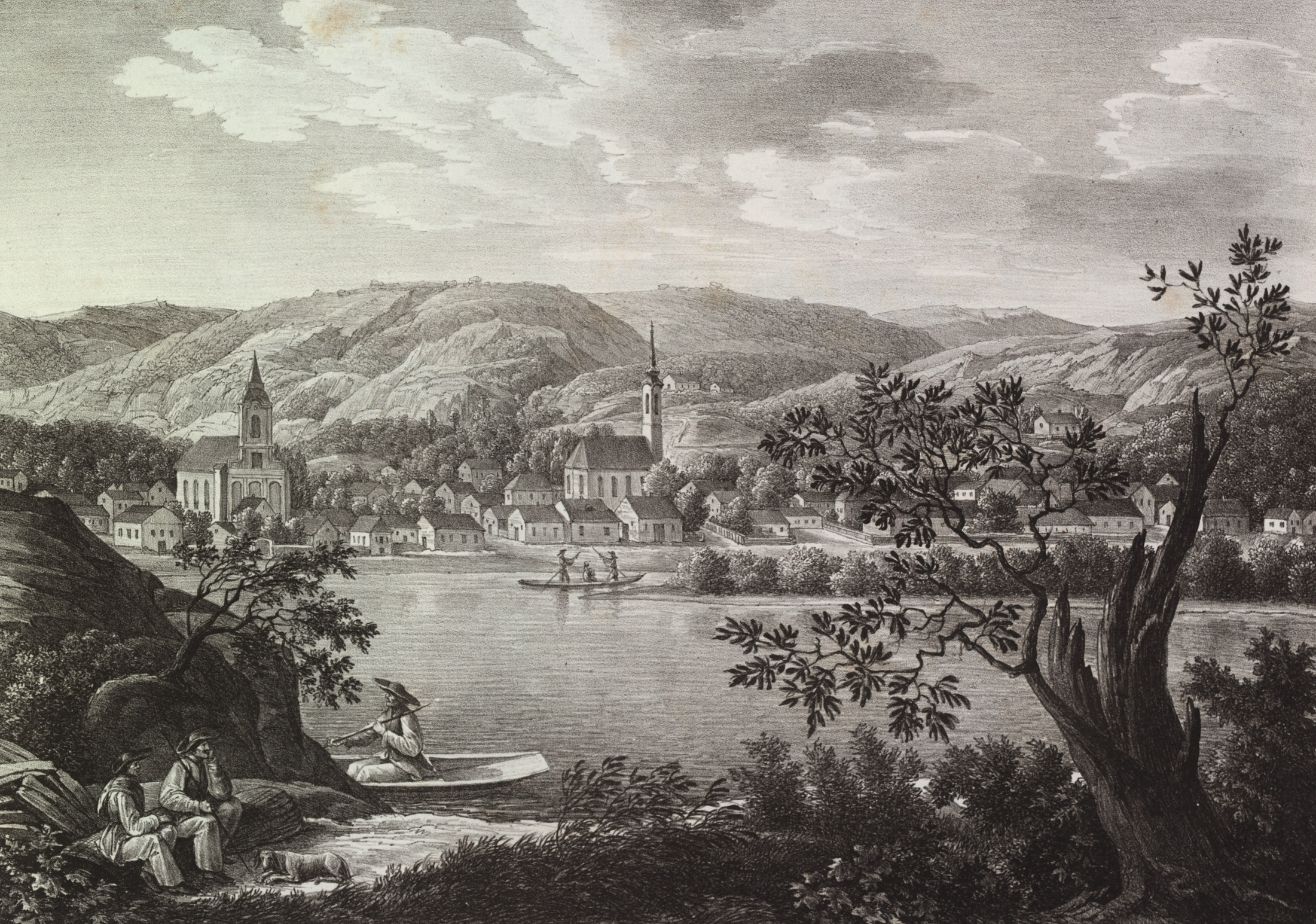
View of Čerević in 1826, featuring both the Orthodox and Catholic church

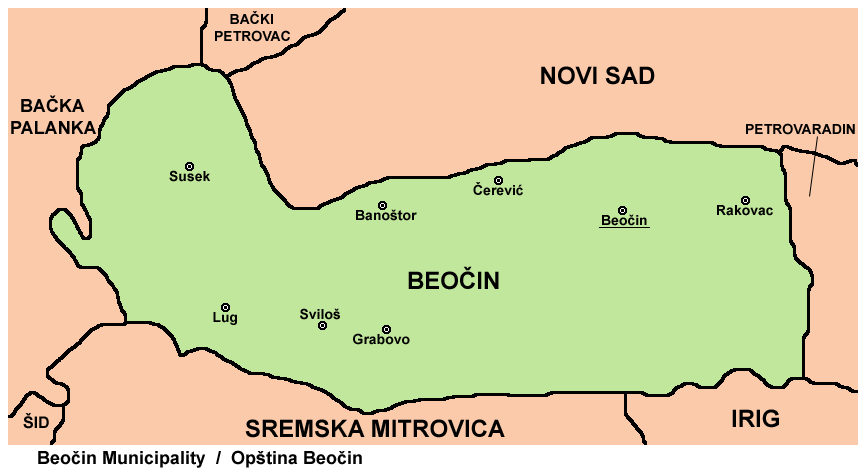
Map of the Beočin municipality, showing the location of Čerević

In Serbian the village is known as Čerević (Черевић), in Croatian as Čerević, and in Hungarian as Cserög.

== History ==
During the Axis occupation in World War II, 87 civilians were killed in Čerević by fascists.

== Historical population ==
- 1931: 2,447
- 1961: 2,096
- 1971: 2,144
- 1981: 2,527
- 1991: 2,510
- 2011: 2,798
- 2022: 2,141

== See also ==
- List of places in Serbia
- List of cities, towns and villages in Vojvodina
