= Pavle Trpinac =

Serbian chemist

Pavle Trpinac (Novi Sad, Austria-Hungary, 27 June 1905 - Belgrade, Serbia, Yugoslavia, 1991) was a Serbian chemist and professor at the University of Belgrade. His niece was poet Mira Alečković.

Pavle Trpinac is best remembered for heading the teaching staff of the Biochemistry classes at the Department of Pharmaceutics in Belgrade from 1946 until his retirement. He was present when the Section for Sanitary Chemistry, combining medical biochemists, sanitary chemists and toxicologists, was founded in Belgrade on 1 January 1951. Later, that same section became the Serbian Section for Medical Biochemistry and Pavle Trpinac was appointed its first president. In 1960 when the Faculty of Medicine was established at the University of Niš, the first generation of students at the new faculty was taught by Dr. Pavle Trpinac.

Trpinac investigated soluble starch and sulfhydryl "(mercapto) group of proteins in the activity of dehydrogenase and the protective effect of cosimase on the mercaptan group dehydrogenase". His other research and scientific papers written and published by himself or co-written with his colleagues are all connected to the study of Biochemistry in medicine.

== Biography ==
Pavle Trpinac was born on 27 June 1905, in Novi Sad, where he graduated from the local gymnasium. In 1925 he enrolled at the Medical Faculty of the University of Belgrade and graduated in 1934. During his studies, from 1927 to 1932, he worked as a demonstrator at the Chemical Institute of the Faculty of Medicine, that is until he completed his military service (1932-1933). Immediately after graduating, he was appointed assistant at the Faculty of Medicine in Belgrade, then assistant-trainee in 1935, and assistant in 1938. In order to improve his chemistry, in the period from 1935 to 1937, Pavle Trpinac attended lectures during four semesters at the Technological Department of the Technical Faculty in Belgrade. He was appointed assistant professor of Medical Chemistry at the Medical Faculty in Belgrade in 1939. During 1936 and 1939. he studied in biochemistry at the 'Institut de Biologie in Paris and in the Laboratoire de phisico-chimique with Irène Joliot-Curie.

During World War II, he was captured and taken into captivity in Germany, where he worked as a doctor in a Nazi prisoner-of-war camp constructed specifically for Russian military and civilian internees. After the founding of the Faculty of Pharmacy in Belgrade, Assistant Professor Trpinac was appointed associate professor of Biochemistry in 1946.

When Professor Petar Matavulj died in 1948, Professor Trpinac became the director of the Chemical Institute of the Faculty of Medicine, as well as the director of the Institute of Biochemistry of the Faculty of Pharmacy. He transferred to the Faculty of Medicine in 1958, and the following year he was elected a full professor. During 1949, he spent three months in France, Belgium and Switzerland, gathering experiences from teaching biochemistry, as well as the organization of clinical chemistry laboratories.

He passed his habilitation with the thesis "Replacement of blood plasma".

Professor Trpinac also taught Chemistry part-time at the Faculty of Dentistry. He was a member of the Commission for Medical Scientific Research (KOMNIS) since its establishment.

In addition, he was a member of the first Scientific Council of the Chemical Institute of the Serbian Academy of Sciences, formed in 1948. He was the first president of the Section for Medical Biochemistry of the Pharmaceutical Society of Serbia.

For his care in the treatment of Soviet prisoners in German camps during the Second World War, by the decree of the Supreme Soviet of the USSR, he was awarded the Order of the Patriotic War of the II degree in 1967.

Professor Pavle Trpinac died in 1991 in Belgrade.

== Works (partial list) ==
Professor Trpinac wrote numerous textbooks alone or co-wrote with colleagues:

- Opšta hemija: za studente medicine i stomatologije
- Osnovi opšte i neorganske hemije: za studente medicine...
- Hemijski praktikumbooks
- Osnovi organske hemije: za studente medicine i stomatologije
- Repetitorijum neorganske hemije: za studente medicine
- Internacionalni sistem mernih jedinica (SI) u medicini
- and others

== Selected papers ==
- Reich, W.S., Trpinac, P .: Sur les appelées „Amidon soluble“. Bulletin de la Société Chimique de France 1937; 4: 1921.
- Trpinac, P .: The dehydration of sulfhydryl groups for the activity of glyceric aldehyde dehydration. Compts Rendus des séances de la Société de Biologie 1939; CXXXI: 24.
- Rapkine, L., Rapkine, S., Trpinac, P .: Effect of protection of the cosimase on the sulfhydryls groups of dehydrates. Assets of the sessions of the Academy of Sciences 1939; 209: 253.
- Trpinac, P., Bugarski, O .: Immunoelectrophoresis. Archives of Pharmacy 1959; 5: 257.
- Pavlović, V., Trpinac, P .: Application of periodic oxidation for the study of dextran structure. 1962 Review
