= Žarko Mićin =

Serbian politician (born 1982)

- Жарко Мићин
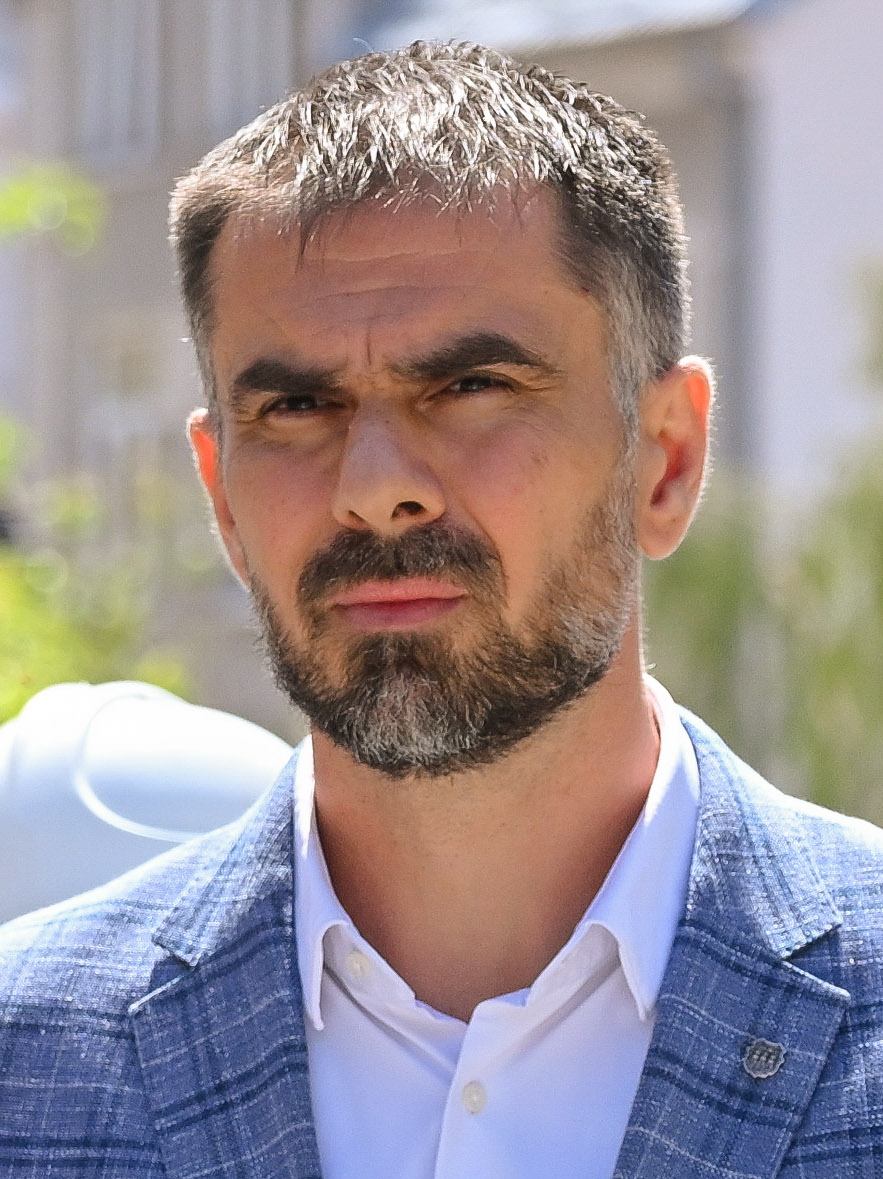
- Mićin in 2025

Mayor of Novi Sad
- Incumbent
- Assumed office 24 February 2025
- Preceded by: Milan Đurić

Personal details
- Born: July 20, 1982 (age 44)
- Party: SNS
- Education: University of Novi Sad
- Occupation: Politician, lawyer

Žarko Mićin (Serbian Cyrillic: Жарко Мићин; born July 20, 1982) is a Serbian lawyer and politician who has served as the mayor of Novi Sad since 2025. He served in the National Assembly of Serbia from 2014 to 2021 as a member of the Serbian Progressive Party.

== Private career ==
Mićin is a graduate of the University of Novi Sad Faculty of Law. He served as the director of JP Zavod za izgradnju grada in 2012 and of SPC Vojvodina in 2013. In 2014, he became executive director of JP "Urbanizam" Zavod za urbanizam Novi Sad.

== Politician ==
=== Provincial and municipal politics ===
Mićin sought election to the Assembly of Vojvodina in the 2012 provincial election, running in Novi Sad's fifth division. He was defeated in the second round. He was also given the fiftieth position on the Progressive Party's electoral list for the Assembly of Novi Sad in the 2012 Serbian local elections. The list won fifteen mandates, and he was not elected.

In November 2020, he was appointed as chief of staff for Novi Sad mayor Miloš Vučević.

=== Parliamentarian ===
Mićin received the 130th position on the Progressive Party's Aleksandar Vučić — Future We Believe In list in the 2014 Serbian parliamentary election and was elected when the list won a majority of with 158 out of 250 seats. He was promoted to the eighty-ninth position in the successor Aleksandar Vučić – Serbia Is Winning list in the 2016 election and was re-elected when the alliance won a second consecutive majority with 131 seats.

During the 2016–20 parliament, Mićin was a member of the European integration committee and the committee on the judiciary, public administration, and local self-government; a member of the European Union–Serbia stabilization and association committee; a deputy member of Serbia's delegation to the NATO Parliamentary Assembly (where Serbia has observer status); the leader of Serbia's parliamentary friendship group with Hungary; and a member of the parliamentary friendship groups with Armenia, Azerbaijan, Brazil, Canada, China, France, Germany, Greece, India, Iran, Ireland, Israel, Italy, Japan, Liechtenstein, the Netherlands, Norway, Russia, Slovenia, Spain, Switzerland, and the United States of America.

Mićin also became a substitute member of Serbia's delegation to the Parliamentary Assembly of the Council of Europe in October 2017. He served with the European People's Party group and was an alternate member of the committee on legal affairs and human rights.

He received the 128th position on the Progressive Party's Aleksandar Vučić — For Our Children coalition list in the 2020 Serbian parliamentary election and was elected to a third term when the list won a landslide majority with 188 mandates. Furthermore, he continued to serve as a full member of the judiciary committee and was a deputy member of the European integration committee and the stabilization and association committee, and a full member of Serbia's delegation to the NATO parliamentary assembly. He again led Serbia's parliamentary friendship group with Hungary and was a member of the friendship groups with China, France, Germany, and the United States of America.

Mićin resigned from the assembly on 3 March 2021.

=== Mayor of Novi Sad ===
Žarko Mićin was appointed mayor of Novi Sad on 24 February 2025, after the resignation of Milan Đurić on 28 January 2025, in the aftermath of the Novi Sad railway station canopy collapse.

== Electoral record ==
=== Provincial (Vojvodina) ===
2012 Vojvodina assembly election Novi Sad V (constituency seat) - First and Second Rounds
Aleksandar Grmuša (incumbent)	Choice for a Better Vojvodina	5,653	24.02	11,172	56.49
Žarko Mićin	Let's Get Vojvodina Moving (Affiliation: Serbian Progressive Party)	5,083	21.60	8,605	43.51
Zlata Peričin	League of Social Democrats of Vojvodina	3,468	14.74		
Miroslav Mirosavljević	Serbian Radical Party	2,161	9.18		
Dragan Rađen	Socialist Party of Serbia–Party of United Pensioners of Serbia– United Serbia–Social Democratic Party of Serbia	2,151	9.14		
Saša Petković	Democratic Party of Serbia	1,864	7.92		
Dalibor Novaković	Maja Gojković–United Regions of Serbia	1,447	6.15		
Maja Stogov Damjanović	Preokret	1,061	4.51		
Zoran Rapaić	Serb Democratic Party	647	2.75		
Total valid votes		23,535	100	19,777	100

Political offices
Preceded by Milan Đurić	Mayor of Novi Sad; 2025-present	Incumbent
