= Sava Dečanac =

- Bishop of Žiča
- Native name: Сава Дечанац
- Diocese: Eparchy of Žiča
- Installed: 3 July 1889
- Term ended: 17 May 1913
- Predecessor: Nikanor Ružičić
- Successor: Nikolaj Velimirović
- Previous post: administrator of Vranje

Orders
- Consecration: 3 July 1889
- Rank: Metropolitan

Personal details
- Born: Đorđe Barać; 1 October 1831 Gnježdane, Ottoman Empire
- Died: 17 May 1913 (aged 81) Čačak, Kingdom of Serbia
- Buried: Žiča (1913), Dečani (1936)
- Denomination: Eastern Orthodoxy
- Education: Kiev Theological Academy

Đorđe Barać (Serbian: Ђорђе Бараћ; 1831–1913), known as Sava Dečanac (Сава Дечанац), was a Serbian Orthodox priest who notably participated in wars and rose to the rank of bishop.

== Early life ==
Barać was born on 1 October 1831 in the village of Gnježdane near Novi Pazar. He received primary education at the Dečani monastery where he took monastic vows, as Sava, on Christmas 1854. He was ordained a deacon at Deževo on 2 March 1855 by Metropolitan Melentije of Raška-Prizren and as a hieromonk on 5 March at the Church of the Holy Apostles, thereafter serving as the spiritual director (duhovnik) of the Dečani metochion in Pirot. In 1861 he moved to Belgrade and entered the Seminary.

During his studies at Belgrade, a conflict broke out with the Turks in June 1862, and he participated in the battles at the barricades. Other notable people who participated in the barricades were Miloš Milojević and Kosta Šumenković, who Sava befriended.

Upon finishing his studies he became a teacher in Peć in the Kosovo Vilayet. Supported by Metropolitan of Belgrade Mihailo, Sava enrolled at the Kiev Theological Academy, where he graduated with a degree in theology in 1871. In August 1871 he was appointed the rector at the Prizren Seminary. Due to Muslim oppression (zulum) he was forced to leave his position on 1 January 1873.

== Wars ==
During the Serbian–Ottoman Wars (1876–1878) he was a commander in the Deževo-Ibar volunteer detachment led by Miloš Milojević.

Among those active in the Serbian–Ottoman Wars (1876–1878) with mobilizing volunteers who illegally crossed the Ottoman–Serbian border to join Serbian forces were especially Todor Stanković (1852–1925), Miloš Milojević, Sava Dečanac, Aksentije Hadži Arsić, teacher Despot Badžović (1850–1930), Kosta Šumenković (1828–1905), Gligorije Čemerikić, and others. A secret committee named "Board for Old Serbia and Macedonia" (Одбор за Стару Србију и Македонију) was established in the beginning of 1877, with initiatives for liberation of Macedonia and solving the Macedonian question. Members included Kosta Šumenković from Struga, Todor Stanković from Niš, professor Miloš Milojević, archimandrite Sava Dečanac, Aksentije Hadži Arsić, Despot Badžović and his brother Kuzman Badžović, Gligorije Čemerikić and others. They also informed representatives of the Great Powers and the Russian Empire of their demands. Sava was in the delegation of "Serbs of Old Serbia" that petitioned the Serbian government on 2 and 20 May 1877 for the liberation and unification of Old Serbia with the Principality of Serbia. As "representatives of Old Serbia", Sava, Arsić, Stanković and Badžović asked for financial support in their work, in a letter dated 7 June 1877 to Jevrem Grujić, a representative of the Ministry of Internal Affairs. They received financial aid on 15 June, 4 and 24 August 1877. On 10 July 1877, with the crossing of Russian troops at the Danube, the Board feared for Bulgarian propaganda in Old Serbia and wrote a letter, one of many, to the Ministry of Internal Affairs. On 25 May 1878, the Board asked that Sava represent Old Serbia in the international talks of the Congress of Berlin. He participated in the talks.

On 5 April 1879 Matija Ban warned Minister Ristić about aspirations and agitation from Bulgaria, Greece and Austria-Hungary in Macedonia, and suggested that a Board for Macedonia be established in Belgrade, with members Đorđe Maletić, Miloš Milojević, archpriest Jakov Pavlović, Đorđe Popović, Matija Ban, and for the Boards outside Belgrade he suggested Dimitrije Aleksijević in Niš, and archimandrite Sava Dečanac and Despot Badžović in Vranje.

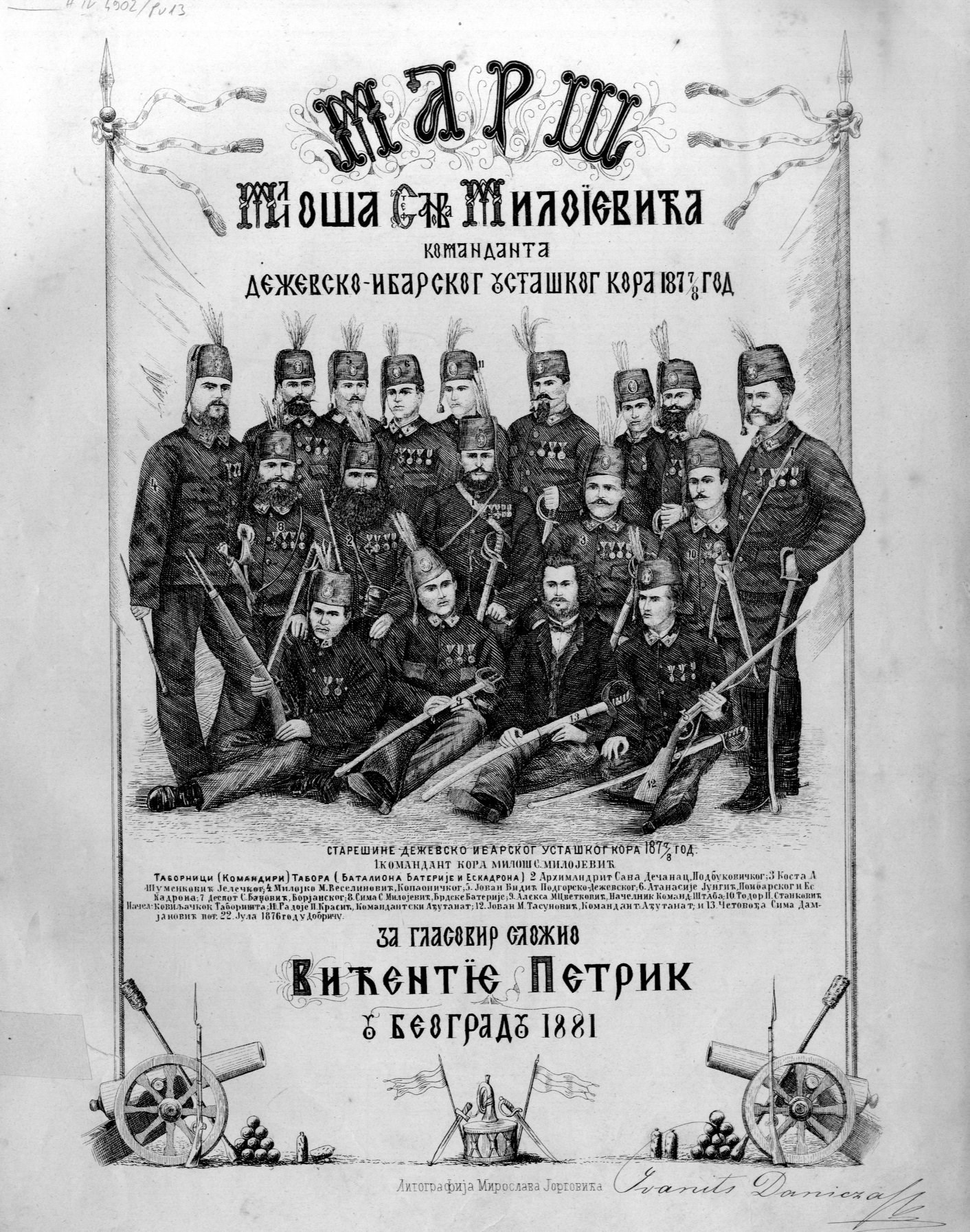
March for Miloš S. Milojević (1881), where Dečanac and his comrades in the Deževo-Ibar corps are illustrated based on a 1876 photograph.

In 1881, Czech-born compositor Vićentije Petrik composed the March of Miloš S. Milojević; the illustration made by Miroslav Jorgović on the front page depicts commander of Deževo-Ibar corps Miloš Milojević and his commanders archimandrite Sava Dečanac of the Podbukovica corps, Kosta Šumenković of the Jeleč corps, Milojko Veselinović of the Kopaonik corps, Jovan Bidić of the Podgora-Deževo corps, Atanasije Jungić of the Poibarje corps, Despot Badžović of the Borjan corps, Sima S. Milojević of the Brda battery, chief of staff Aleksa M. Cvetković, Todor Stanković of the Koviljača camps, commander-adjutant Radoje Krasić, commander-adjutant Jovan Tasunović and cheta-leader Sima Damjanović. The lithograph was most likely done after a photograph dated 22 July 1876 in Dobrič.

After the wars he served as the administrator of the Eparchy of Vranje and was a member of the Užice and then Niš consistoriums.

He participated in the Serbo-Bulgarian War (1885) as the commander of the 2nd Volunteer Detachment.

== Eparchy of Žiča ==
After the dismissal of Nikanor Ružičić, Sava was consecrated bishop of Žiča on 3 July 1889. He reported on his travels and gave valuable information on monasteries and churches in the land. Sava also wrote pastoral epistles. He worked actively for the improvement of Serbs in the Kosovo Vilayet. With the outbreak of the First Balkan War (1912), he held a speech rallying the people.

He died on 17 May 1913 in Čačak and was buried at the Žiča monastery. His wish was that his remains be buried at Dečani, which was done on Vidovdan (St. Vitus Day) in 1936.

== Work ==
- Dečanac, Sava (1890), Прва пастирска посланица епископа жичког Саве Дечанца, Штампарија Љуб. Ј. Бојовића, Београд
- Dečanac, Sava (1891), Друга пастирска посланица епископа жичког Саве Дечанца, Народна штампарија Љубе Ј. Бојовића, Београд
- Dečanac, Sava (1891), Трећа пастирска посланица епископа Жичке епархије Саве Дечанца, Парна штампарија Радикалне странке, Београд
- Dečanac, Sava (1893), Пета пастирска посланица епископа жичког Саве Дечанца, Краљевско-српска Државна штампарија, Београд
- Dečanac, Sava (1893), Извешће Светјејшему Архијерејском Сабору о каноничкој визитацији епископа жичког Саве Дечанца, Државна штампарија Краљевине Србије, Београд
- Dečanac, Sava (1897), Владалац и народ: крунисање и миропомазање владаоца, дужности његове и народне, штампарија краљевине Србије, Београд
- Dečanac, Sava (1899), Манастири у Краљевини Србији: поглед на њихову судбину од 1200. до 1900. год., Државна штампарија Краљевине Србије, Београд
- Dečanac, Sava (1899), Пастирска посланица епископа жичког Саве Дечанца, С. Бараћ, Чачак
- Dečanac, Sava (1902), Помозимо Високим Дечанима!, Електрична штампарија Тодора К. Наумовића, Београд
- Dečanac, Sava (1902), Монаштво и чиновнички удовички фонд, С. Бараћ, Чачак
- Dečanac, Sava (1902), Пастирска посланица епископа жичког Саве Дечанца, Штампарија Стевана Матића, Чачак
- Dečanac, Sava (1904), Дечани и српски народ. Део 1, Штампарија Бојовића и Мићића, Београд
- Dečanac, Sava (1904), Пастирска посланица епископа Жичке епархије Саве Дечанца, Штампарија Бојовића и Мићића, Београд
- Dečanac, Sava (1905), Дечани и српски народ. Део 2, Штампарија Бојовића и Мићића, Београд
- Dečanac, Sava (1905), Право старешинства у цркви: ђаконска права, Електрична штампарија Тодора К. Наумовића, Београд
- Dečanac, Sava (1906), Пастирска посланица епископа Жичке епархије Саве Дечанца: на дан недеље православља (прве недеље поста), Штампарија Стевана Матића, Чачак
- Dečanac, Sava (1907), Монаштво и чиновничко-удовички фонд, 2. допуњено изд., Штампарија "Меркур", Београд
- Dečanac, Sava (1907), Пастирска посланица епископа Жичке епархије Саве Дечанца, Штампарија Стевана Матића, Чачак
- Dečanac, Sava (1908), Пастирска посланица епископа Жичке епархије Саве Дечанца, Штампарија Стевана Матића, Чачак
- Dečanac, Sava (1908), Важи ли за цркву рашчињење свештених лица кад је оно као последица пресуда грађанских судова, Штампарија Андре Петровића
- Dečanac, Sava (1909), Бракови у несразмерним годинама, Штампарија А. Петровића, Београд
- Dečanac, Sava (1909), Пастирска посланица епископа жичког Саве Дечанца, Штампарија Стевана Матића, Чачак
- Dečanac, Sava (1910), Накнадно о браковима у несразмерним годинама, Штампарија "Св. Сава", Београд
- Dečanac, Sava (1910), Удавање, одбегавање и отимање девојака, Штампарија "Св. Сава", Београд
- Dečanac, Sava (1910), Пастирска посланица епископа Жичке епархије Саве Дечанца, Штампарија Стевана Матића, Чачак
- Dečanac, Sava (1911), Пастирска посланица епископа Жичке епархије Саве Дечанца, Штампарија Стевана Матића, Чачак
- Dečanac, Sava (1912), Пастирска посланица епископа Жичке епархије Саве Дечанца, Штампарија Стевана Матића, Чачак

== Sources ==
- Arhiv Srbije (1983). Građa za istoriju makedonskog naroda iz Arhiva Srbije: knj. 1. 1868-1873. Arhiv Srbije. pp. 18–.
- Cvetković, Sonja C. (2019). "СИНЕСТЕЗИЈА ВИЗУЕЛНОГ И МУЗИЧКОГ – ВИЋЕНТИЈЕ ПЕТРИК: МАРШ МИЛОША С. МИЛОЈЕВИЋА". Баштина (48). Приштина–Лепосавић.
- Dečanac, Sava (2001). Stradanje Stare Srbije i Makedonije. Dom kulture Sveti Dava. ISBN 978-86-83629-02-2.
- Jagodić, Miloš (2011). "Планови o политици Србије према Старој Србији и Македонији (1878-1885)". Историјски Часопис. 60: 435–460 – via CEEOL.
- Lilić, Borislava (2015). "ОСЛОБОЂЕЊЕ НИША У ДРУГОМ СРПСКО-ТУРСКОМ РАТУ 1877/78. У СПИСИМА САВРЕМЕНИКА" (PDF). Zbornik. 13. Niš: Narodni muzej Niš: 155–172.
- Mitrović, Andrej (1996). Stojanu Novakoviću u spomen: o osamdesetogodišnjici smrti. Srpska književna zadruga. p. 68. ISBN 9788637906247.
- Paunović, Aleksandar (2024). "РАД ЕПИСКОПА САВЕ ДЕЧАНЦА НА ПРИВРЕДНОМ ПЛАНУ У КРАЉЕВУ И ОКОЛИНИ КРАЈЕМ 19. И ПОЧЕТКОМ 20. ВЕКА" [The work of bishop Sava Dečanac in the economic development of Kraljevo and its surroundings at the end of the 19th and the beginning of the 20th century]. Bastina (62): 339–349. doi:10.5937/bastina34-47179. ISSN 0353-9008.
- Sava (1996). Српски јерарси од деветог до двадесетог века. Belgrade, Podgorica: Евро; Унирекс.
- Vojinović, Staniša (2016). "Учитељ, публициста и национални радник Деспот с. Баџовић". Вардарски Зборник. 11: 109–120.
