= University of Novi Sad Faculty of Law =

- Правни факултет Универзитета у Новом Саду
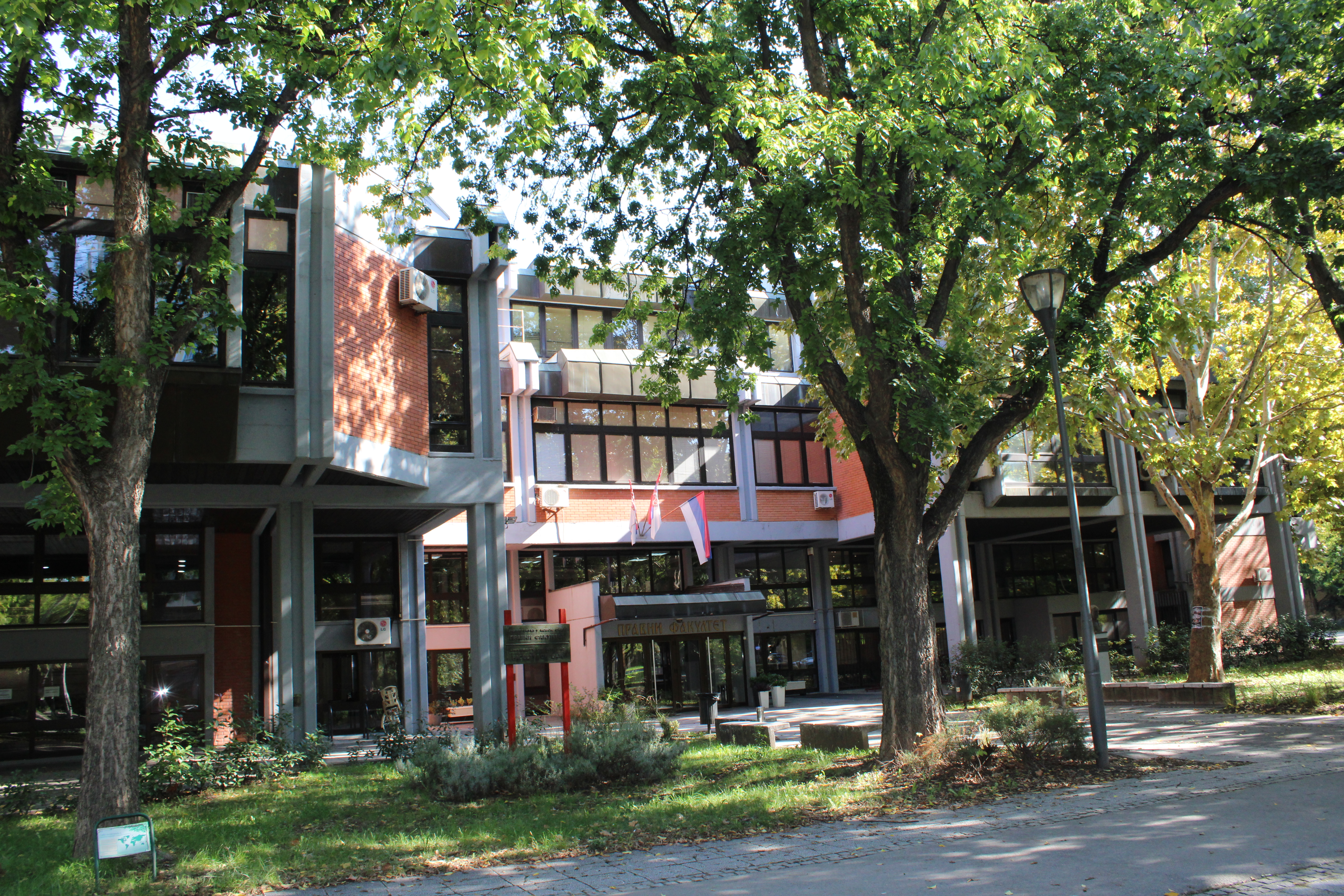
- Type: Public
- Established: July 20, 1955; 70 years ago
- Dean: Vladimir Marjanski
- Academic staff: 51 (2018–19)
- Students: 2,453 (2018–19)
- Undergraduates: 2,042 (2018–19)
- Postgraduates: 325 (2018–19)
- Doctoral students: 86 (2018–19)
- Location: Novi Sad, Serbia; 45°14′47.1″N 19°51′10.5″E
- Campus: Urban
- Website: www.pf.uns.ac.rs

The University of Novi Sad Faculty of Law (Serbian: Правни факултет Универзитета у Новом Саду, romanized: Pravni fakultet Univerziteta u Novom Sadu), also known as the Novi Sad Law School, is a constituent body of the University of Novi Sad, Serbia. The school is located on the university campus on the bank of the Danube river in the downtown district, on the opposite side of the Petrovaradin Fortress.

== History ==
The Novi Sad Law School was established through a state legal act on July 20, 1955. The school was initially part of the University of Belgrade and it followed the Belgrade Law School's curriculum. As the school developed, it subsequently became independent.

== Organization ==
The law school is divided into nine units conducting teaching and research activities:

- Chair of Civil Law;
- Chair of Commercial Law;
- Chair of Criminal Law;
- Chair of History of State and Law;
- Chair of Theory of State and Law, Philosophy of Law and Sociology;
- Chair of Public Law;
- Chair of Labor and Welfare Law;
- Chair of International Law and
- Chair of Law and Economics.

== Publishing center ==
The Publishing Center was established in 1991. The Center has published about 60 scholarly monographs, textbooks and handbooks since its existence. The Novi Sad Law School's Collected Papers is a law journal published in Serbian since 1966.

== Degree programs ==
The law studies last four years carrying 240 ECTS credits. Candidates with secondary education are entitled to take an admission test comprising questions from Serbian literature and History. Each year divided into two semesters. Every year carries 60 ECTS credits.

Master's degree studies last one year and carry 60 ECTS credits. Prospective students should hold a bachelor's degree in law (worth 240 ECTS) or a diploma in law worth at least 240 ECTS from another school with a similar curriculum.

The Novi Sad Law School offers a number of courses in English established through TEMPUS, a European student mobility program.
