= List of mayors of Novi Sad =

Mayor of Novi Sad
- Coat of arms of Novi Sad

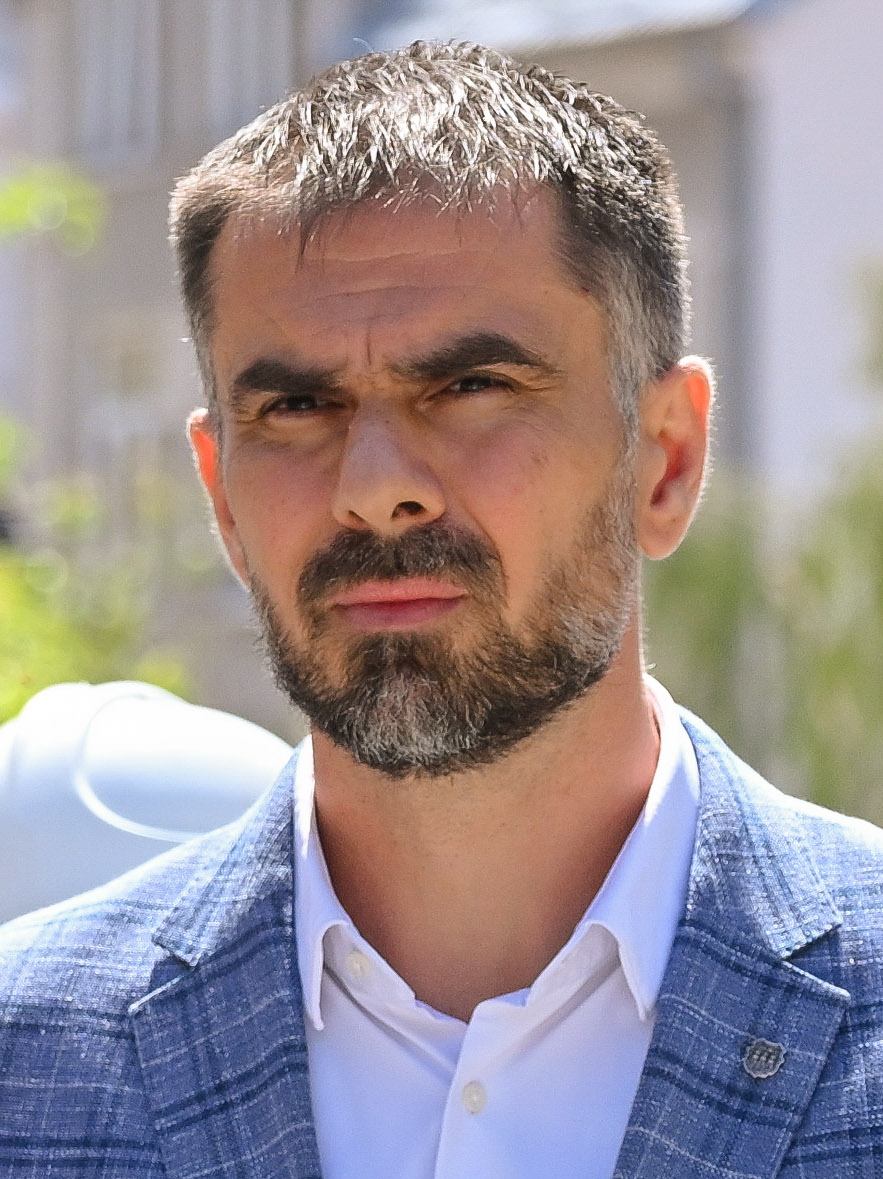
- Incumbent; Žarko Mićin since 24 February 2025
- Style: Mayor
- Member of: City Council
- Reports to: City Assembly
- Residence: No official residence
- Seat: City Hall
- Term length: 4 years
- Inaugural holder: Ignjac Hajl
- Formation: 1 February 1748
- Deputy: Igor Crnobarac

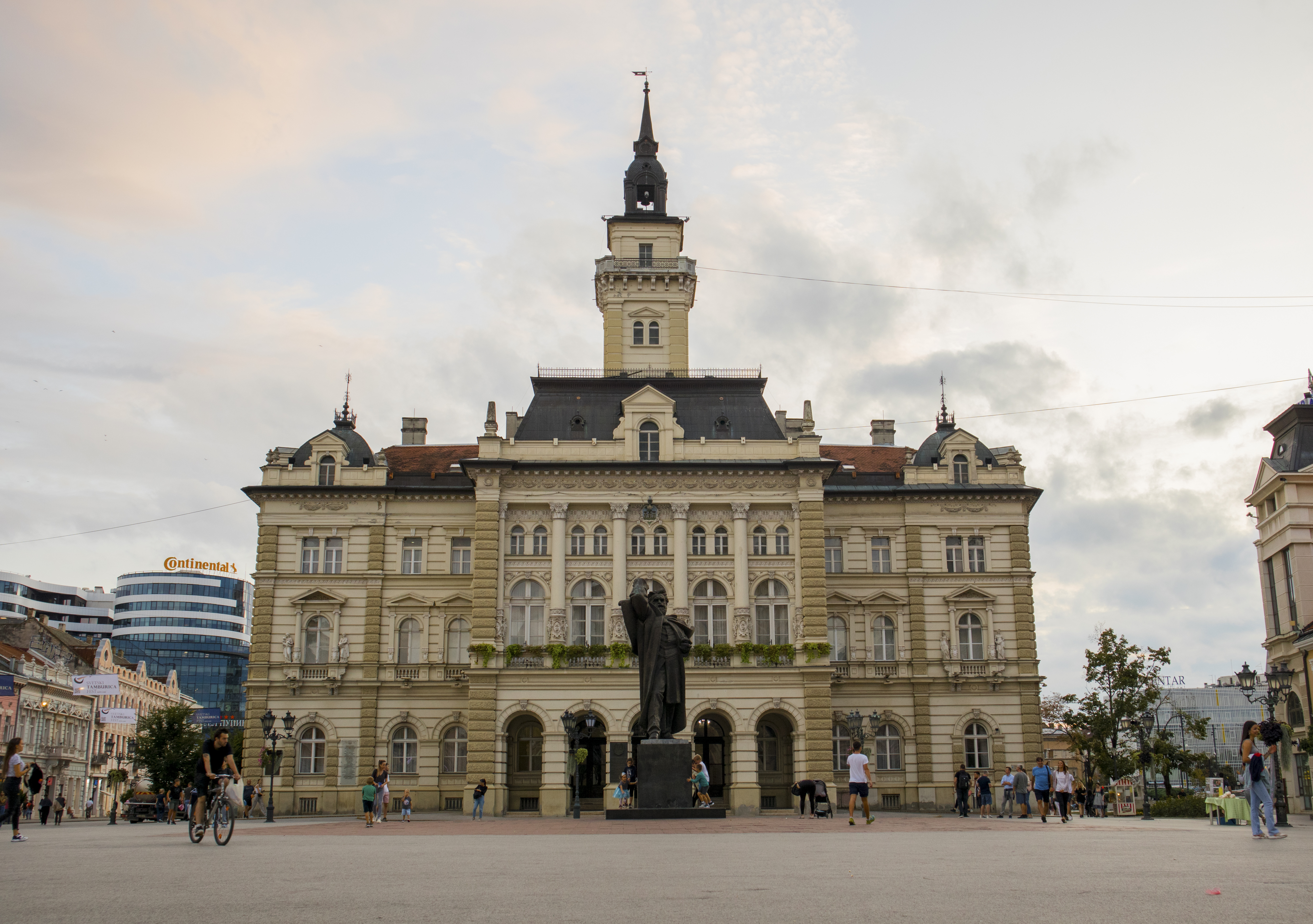
The City Hall – Office of the mayor. Built in 1894 according to the project of architect Molnár György.

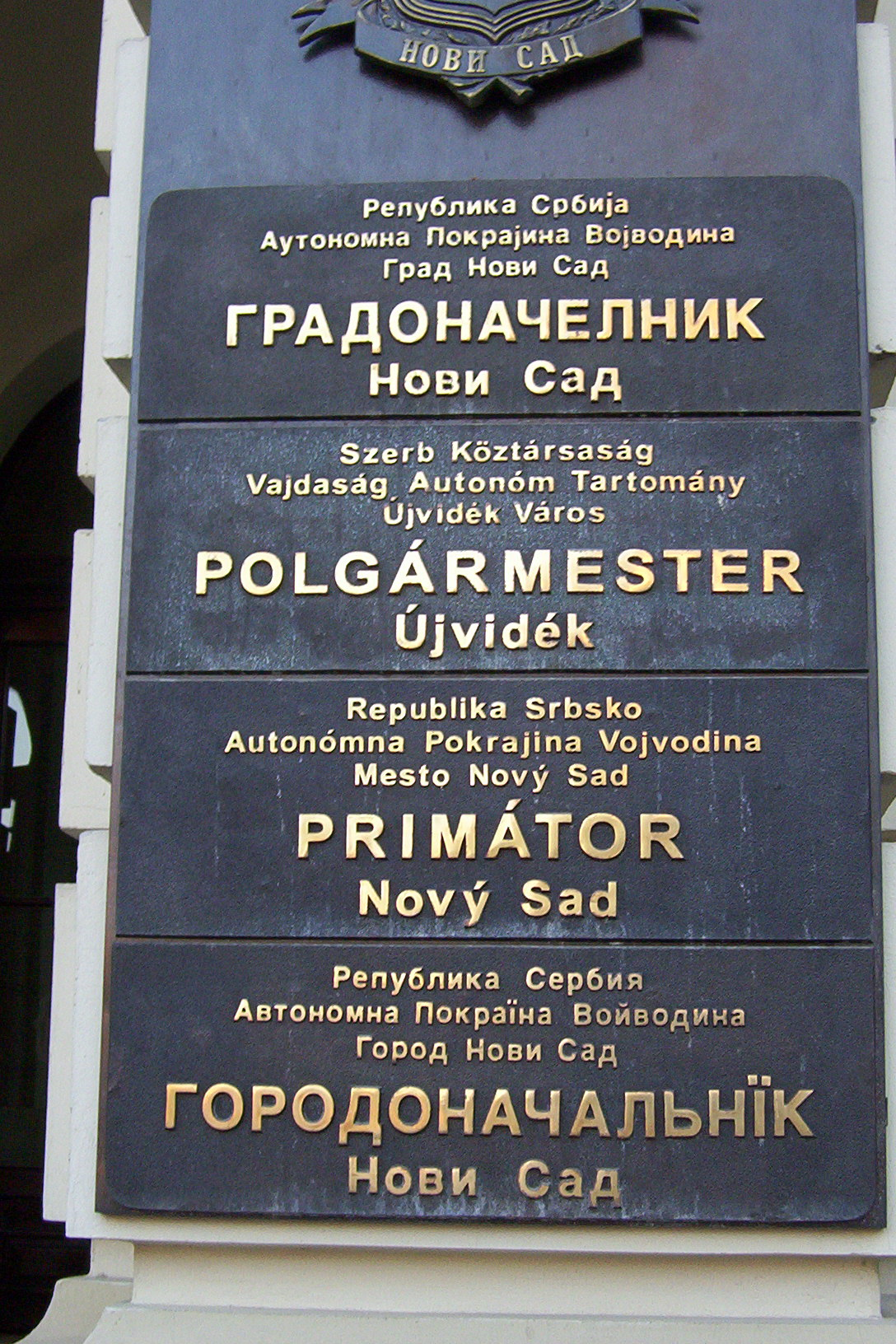
Mayor office written in four official languages used in the City of Novi Sad (Serbian, Hungarian, Slovak, and Rusyn).

This is a list of mayors of Novi Sad from 1 February 1748, when the city got royal free city status by Maria Theresa of Austria.

The mayor of Novi Sad is the head of the City of Novi Sad (the second largest city in Serbia and the administrative center of the Autonomous Province of Vojvodina). The mayor acts on behalf of the City, and performs an executive function in the City of Novi Sad. The current mayor of Novi Sad is Žarko Mićin (SNS). He was elected by the City Assembly on 24 February 2025, following the resignation of Milan Đurić, who served as mayor from 2022 to 2025.

== Habsburg monarchy / Austrian Empire / Austria-Hungary ==
- Ignjac Hajl (1748 – 1752)
- Pantelija Milanković (1752 – 1756)
- József Tir (1756 – 1766)
- David Racković (1766 – 1772)
- József Ridi (1772 – 1778)
- David Racković (1778 – 1784)
- József Ridi (1784 – 1786)
- Ferenc Kasonyi (1786)
- József Szopron (1786 – 1793)
- Dimitrije Bugarski (1789 – 1793)
- József Szopron (1800 – 1801)
- Franz Schtrwetzki (1801 – 1807)
- Andrea Odi (1807 – 1810)
- Grigorije Janković (1810 – 1822)
- Georgije Konstantinović (1822 – 1831)
- Franz Lang (1835 – 1836)
- Johann Kerber (1836 – 1839)
- Franz Lang (1839 – 1840)
- Jovan Kamber (1840 – 1848)
- Petar Zako (1848)
- Pavle Jovanović (1848 – 1849)
- Karlo Molinari (1849)
- Jožef Šimić (1849)
- Pavle Jovanović (1849 – 1850)
- Grigorije Jovišić (1850 – 1853)
- Gavrilo Polzović (1853 – 1861)
- Svetozar Miletić (1861 – 1862)
- Pavle Mačvanski (1862)
- Pavle Stojanović (1862 – 1867)
- Svetozar Miletić (1867 – 1868)
- Pavle Stojanović (1868 – 1869)
- Stevan Branovački (1869 – 1872)
- Pavle Mačvanski (1872 – 1874)
- Jovan Radanović (1878 – 1884)
- Stevan Peci Popović (1884 – 1902)
- Lajos Szalai (1902 – 1906)
- Vladimir Demetrović (1906 – 1914)
- Béla Profuma (1914 – 1918)

== Kingdom of Serbs, Croats and Slovenes / Kingdom of Yugoslavia ==
- Jovan Živojinović (1919 – 1920)
- Stevan Adamović (1920 – 1921)
- Milan Slepčević (1921 – 1922)
- Žarko Stefanović (1922 – 1925)
- Jovan Lakić (1926 – 1928)
- Branislav Borota (1928 – 1936)
- Branko Ilić (1936 – 1938)
- Kosta Milosavljević (1938 – 1939)
- Miloš Petrović (1939 – 1941)

== Hungarian occupation ==
- Miklós Nagy (1941 – 1944)

== DF Yugoslavia / FPR Yugoslavia / SFR Yugoslavia ==
- Alimpije Popović (1944 – 1949) (League of Communists of Yugoslavia)
- Dušan Ibročkić (1949 – 1951) (League of Communists of Yugoslavia)
- Radomir Radujkov (1951 – 1952) (League of Communists of Yugoslavia)
- Todor Jovanović (1952 – 1956) (League of Communists of Yugoslavia)
- Milosav Gonja (1956) (League of Communists of Yugoslavia)
- Boža Melkus (1957 – 1962) (League of Communists of Yugoslavia)
- Tima Vrbaški (1962 – 1967) (League of Communists of Yugoslavia)
- Dušan Ilijević (1967 – 1973) (League of Communists of Yugoslavia)
- Milan Čanak (1974) (League of Communists of Yugoslavia)
- Jovan Dejanović (1974 – 1982) (League of Communists of Yugoslavia)
- Branislav Dejanović (1982 – 1983) (League of Communists of Yugoslavia)
- Zdravko Mutin (1983 – 1984) (League of Communists of Yugoslavia)
- Aleksandar Horvat (1984 – 1985) (League of Communists of Yugoslavia)
- Boško Petrov (1985 – 1989) (League of Communists of Yugoslavia)
- Vlada Popović (1989 – 1992) (League of Communists of Yugoslavia)

== FR Yugoslavia / Serbia and Montenegro ==
Denotes Acting Mayor

Portrait	Name (Birth–Death)	Term of office			Political party
Portrait	Name (Birth–Death)	Took office	Left office	Time in office	Political party
	Vladimir Divjaković (born 1946)	1992	13 January 1993	1 year	Socialist Party of Serbia
	Milorad Mirčić (1956–2025)	13 January 1993	24 June 1994	1 year, 162 days	Serbian Radical Party
	Milorad Đurđević (born 1940)	24 June 1994	10 January 1995	200 days	Socialist Party of Serbia
	Đuro Bajić (born 1938)	10 January 1995	12 December 1996	1 year, 337 days	Socialist Party of Serbia
	Mihajlo Svilar (1947–2013)	12 December 1996	18 June 1997	188 days	Serbian Renewal Movement
	Stevan Vrbaški (1940–2022)	18 June 1997	20 October 2000	3 years, 124 days	Serbian Renewal Movement
	Borislav Novaković (born 1964)	20 October 2000	5 October 2004	3 years, 351 days	Democratic Party
	Maja Gojković (born 1963)	5 October 2004	5 June 2006	1 year, 243 days	Serbian Radical Party

== Republic of Serbia ==
Portrait	Name (Birth–Death)	Term of office			Political party
Portrait	Name (Birth–Death)	Took office	Left office	Time in office	Political party
	Maja Gojković (born 1963)	5 June 2006	16 June 2008	2 years, 11 days	Serbian Radical Party (until 4 March 2008)
	Maja Gojković (born 1963)	5 June 2006	16 June 2008	2 years, 11 days	Independent
	Igor Pavličić (born 1970)	16 June 2008	12 September 2012	4 years, 88 days	Democratic Party
	Miloš Vučević (born 1974)	12 September 2012	26 October 2022	10 years, 44 days	Serbian Progressive Party
	Milan Đurić (born 1977)	26 October 2022	24 February 2025	2 years, 121 days	Serbian Progressive Party
	Žarko Mićin (born 1982)	24 February 2025	Incumbent	1 year, 260 days	Serbian Progressive Party

== See also ==
- History of Novi Sad
- Politics of Novi Sad
- President of the City Assembly of Novi Sad
