= Borislav Novaković =

Serbian politician

- Борислав Новаковић
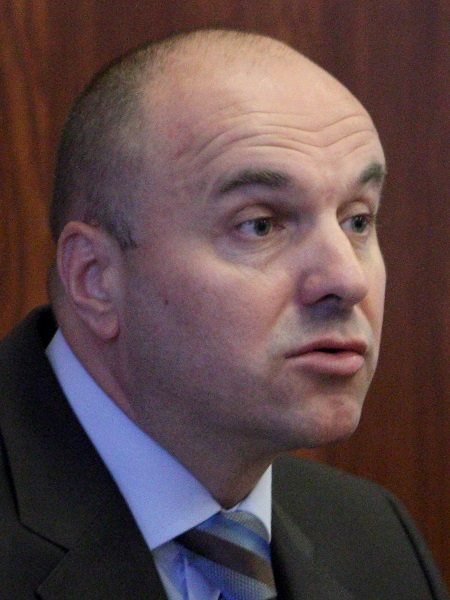

69th Mayor of Novi Sad
- In office 2000–2004
- Preceded by: Stevan Vrbaški
- Succeeded by: Maja Gojković

Personal details
- Born: 21 October 1964 (age 61) Novi Sad, Yugoslavia
- Party: DS (1990–2017); Narodna (2017–2023); NPS (2023–present)

Borislav Novaković, MSc (Cyrillic: Мр. Борислав Новаковић; born 21 October 1964 in Novi Sad) is a Serbian politician. He was a vice-president of People's Party until 2023. From 2000 to 2004, as a member of Democratic Party Novaković was the President of the city Assembly of Novi Sad. After failing re-election, this time in direct popular vote, he was appointed as vice-president of the Assembly of the Autonomous Province of Vojvodina in 2004.

He graduated in sociology from the University of Novi Sad Faculty of Philosophy, where he also worked as a lecturer.

Preceded by Stevan Vrbaški	Mayor of Novi Sad; 2000 - 2004	Succeeded by Maja Gojković
