= Stevan Vrbaški =

Serbian politician (1940–2022)

Stevan Vrbaški (Serbian Cyrillic: Стеван Врбашки; 1940 – 7 December 2022) was a Serbian politician. He was the mayor of Novi Sad from 1997 to 2000 and served in the National Assembly of Serbia and the Assembly of Vojvodina. During his political career, he was a member of the Serbian Renewal Movement (Srpski pokret obnove, SPO).

== Private career ==
Vrbaški was a specialist doctor.

== Politician ==
=== Member of the provincial assembly ===
Vrbaški was elected to the Vojvodina assembly in the December 1992 provincial election, winning Novi Sad's thirteenth division as a candidate of the Democratic Movement of Serbia (Demokratski pokret Srbije, DEPOS), a political coalition led by the SPO. His candidacy was also endorsed by the Democratic Party (Demokratska stranka, DS) and the Reformist Democratic Party of Vojvodina (Reformska demokratska stranka Vojvodine, RDSV). The election was won by the Socialist Party of Serbia (Socijalistička partija Srbije, SPS), and Vrbaški served in opposition. He was not re-elected to the assembly in 1996.

=== Mayor of Novi Sad ===
The SPO joined with the DS and other parties to create the Zajedno (Together) coalition prior to the 1996 Serbian local elections. The coalition was successful in several major cities, including Novi Sad. Vrbaški was personally elected as the SPO, with twenty-two seats out of seventy, became the largest single party in the city assembly. Fellow SPO member Mihajlo Svilar was initially chosen as mayor in late 1996. He resigned on 18 June 1997, and Vrbaški was chosen by the city assembly as his successor. Despite periods of tension, the governing coalition of the SPO, the DS, and the League of Social Democrats of Vojvodina (LSV) remained in power for a full term.

Novi Sad experienced significant damage during the 1999 NATO bombing of Yugoslavia. In an interview with Vreme, Vrbaški described NATO's attacks on the city as unjustified and criticizing Yugoslavian president Slobodan Milošević for not coming to the city in the aftermath of the conflict. In March 2000, he announced that Novi Sad would receive sixteen million German marks from the European Commission for the reconstruction of the city's bridge over the Danube, which had been destroyed in the bombing.

The SPO attempted to run on a united list with the Democratic Opposition of Serbia (DOS) in Novi Sad for the 2000 local elections, but the negotiations were ultimately unsuccessful. The DOS won a landslide victory, and the SPO failed to win any seats. Vrbaški stood down as mayor on 20 October 2000.

=== Parliamentarian ===
While serving as mayor, Vrbaški also appeared in the lead position on the SPO's electoral list for the Novi Sad division in the 1997 Serbian parliamentary election. He was elected when the party won a single mandate for the division. (From 1992 to 2000, Serbia's electoral law stipulated that one-third of parliamentary mandates would be assigned to candidates from successful lists in numerical order, while the remaining two-thirds would be distributed amongst other candidates on the lists by the sponsoring parties. Vrbaški automatically received his party's mandate for the division.) The Socialist Party won the election, and the SPO served in opposition.

Serbia's electoral system was reformed for the 2000 parliamentary election, with the entire country becoming a single electoral division and with all mandates assigned to candidates on successful lists at the discretion of the sponsoring parties or coalitions, irrespective of numerical order. Vrbaški received the twentieth position on the SPO's electoral list in 2000; the list did not cross the threshold to win representation in the assembly. His parliamentary term ended in January 2001.

Vrbaški joined the People's Party (Narodna stranka, NS) in 2020.

== Death ==
Vrbaški died in Novi Sad on 7 December 2022.
