= People's Party (Serbia, 2008) =

People's Party Народна партија Narodna partija
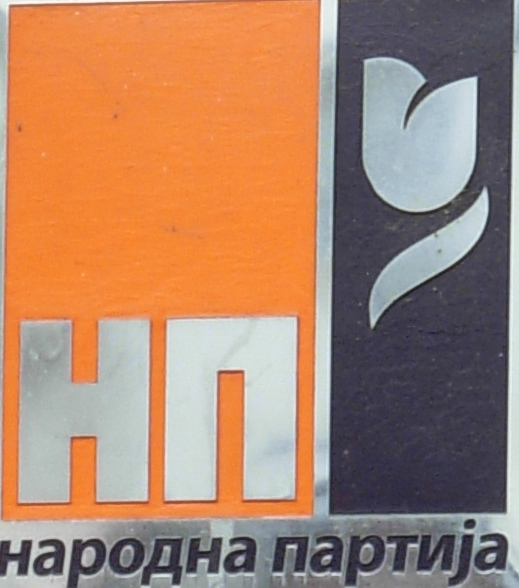
- Leader: Nebojša Korać
- Founder: Maja Gojković
- Founded: October 10, 2008
- Dissolved: December 3, 2012
- Merged into: Serbian Progressive Party
- Headquarters: Novi Sad
- Ideology: Christian democracy
- Political position: Centre
- Colours: Orange
- National Assembly: 0 / 250

Party flag

Website
- www.narodnapartija.rs

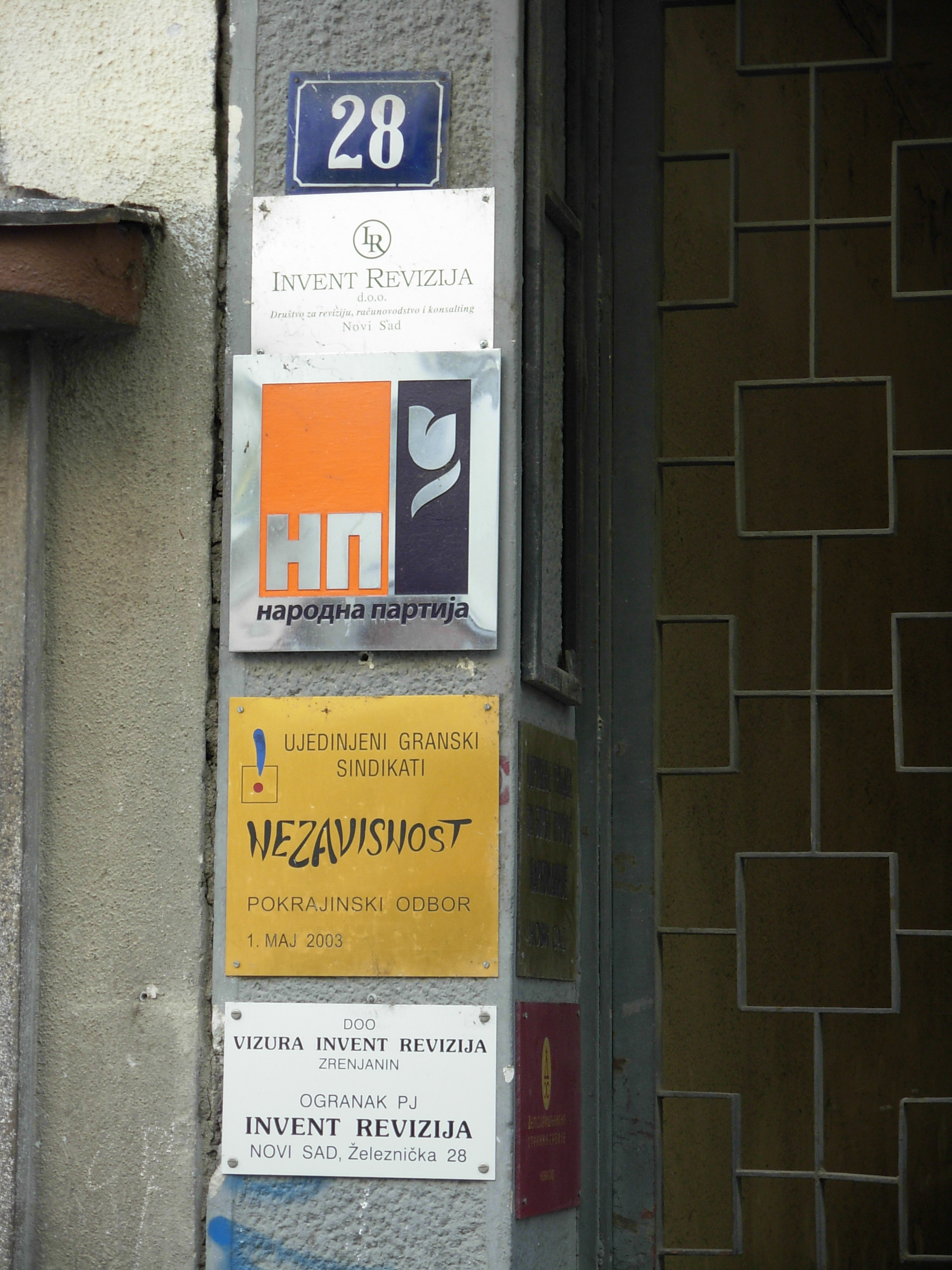
Party headquarters in Novi Sad

The People's Party (Serbian: Народна партија, romanized: Narodna partija, abbr. NP) was a political party in Serbia. It was founded and led by the former Mayor of Novi Sad and former Serbian Radical Party member Maja Gojković.

The party previously intended to take part in the next election together with the Democratic Party of Serbia and New Serbia. In 2010 the party left the populists and together with several other parties, formed the United Regions of Serbia, a broad coalition of regional parties.

The People's Party participated in the 2012 parliamentary elections as part of the United Regions of Serbia coalition, and received 2 seats in the National Assembly. It supported Boris Tadić in the presidential election. The party was expelled from the URS after it separately entered negotiations with the Democratic Party (DS). Gojković described DS as the "natural partner" of NP and said that NP would not support the incoming government led by the Serbian Progressive Party (SNS).

Gojković later reversed her position towards SNS and on 3 December 2012 the party merged into the SNS and ceased to exist. However, some local councils headed by Nebojša Korać opposed this decision, and controversially continued receiving finances proportional to the party's original electoral result, even though both MPs had left the party.
