= Igor Pavličić =

Serbian politician

- Игор Павличић
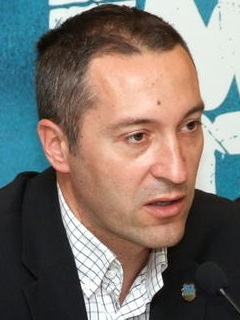

71st Mayor of Novi Sad
- In office 16 June 2008 – 13 September 2012
- Preceded by: Maja Gojković
- Succeeded by: Miloš Vučević

Personal details
- Born: October 15, 1970 (age 55) Belgrade, Yugoslavia
- Party: Democratic Party
- Profession: Lawyer

Igor Pavličić (Serbian Cyrillic: Игор Павличић, pronounced [îɡor pâʋlitʃitɕ]; born 15 October 1970) is a Serbian lawyer and former politician who served as the mayor of Novi Sad from 2008 to 2012 as a member of the Democratic Party. He graduated from the University of Novi Sad Faculty of Law in 1995.

Preceded by Maja Gojković	Mayor of Novi Sad; 2008 - 2012	Succeeded by Miloš Vučević
