= Velebit, Kanjiža =

Velebit Велебит (Serbian)
- Village (Selo)
- Location of Velebit within Serbia Velebit (Serbia) Velebit (Europe)
- Coordinates: 46°00′00″N 19°57′00″E
- Country: Serbia
- Province: Vojvodina
- District: North Banat
- Municipalities: Kanjiža
- Elevation: 84 m (276 ft)

Population (2002)
  - Velebit: 366
- Time zone: UTC+1 (CET)
  - Summer (DST): UTC+2 (CEST)
- Postal code: 24428
- Area code: +381(0)24
- Car plates: KA

Velebit (Serbian Cyrillic: Велебит) is a village in Serbia. It is situated in the Kanjiža municipality, in the North Banat District, Vojvodina province. The village has a Serb ethnic majority with a population of 366 people (2002 census).

== Name ==
In Serbian the settlement is known as Velebit (Велебит) and in Hungarian as Velebit or Fogadjisten (Hungarian pronunciation: [ˈfoɡɒɟɟiʃtɛn]). There is a mountain range in Croatia with same name (see: Velebit).

== Ethnic groups (2002 census) ==
- Serbs = 302 (82.51%)
- Hungarians = 59 (16.12%)
- Croats = 3 (0.82%)
- Montenegrins = 1 (0.27%)
- undeclared = 1 (0.27%)

Velebit is the only settlement with Serb majority in the Kanjiža municipality since all other settlements are predominantly Hungarian.

== Historical population ==
- 1961: 604
- 1971: 562
- 1981: 449
- 1991: 361

== History ==
The settlement was founded after the First World War, as part of the introduction program by which new immigrants were settled in Vojvodina.

Former mayor of Novi Sad Jovan Dejanović was born in Kanjiža.

== See also ==
- List of places in Serbia
- List of cities, towns and villages in Vojvodina
