= Vladimir Divjaković =

Serbian politician and academic (born 1946)

Vladimir Divjaković (Serbian Cyrillic: Владимир Дивјаковић; born 23 February 1946) is an academic and former politician in Serbia. He was the mayor of Novi Sad from 1992 to 1993 and served in the National Assembly of Serbia from 1993 to 1994. During his time in politics, he was a member of the Socialist Party of Serbia (Socijalistička partija Srbije, SPS).

== Early life and academic career ==
Divjaković was born in Novi Sad, Autonomous Province of Vojvodina, in what was then the People's Republic of Serbia in the Federal People's Republic of Yugoslavia. He received his early education in Novi Sad and nearby Sremski Karlovci. He graduated from the University of Belgrade's Faculty of Mathematics in 1968, received a master's degree in 1974, and earned a Ph.D. from the Faculty of Philosophy and Natural Sciences at the University of Bern in 1976. Divjaković began working at the University of Novi Sad in 1969, became a full professor in 1988, and was president of the university council in 1991–92 and 1992–93. He has published widely in the field of mineralogy-crystallography.

== Politician ==
Divjaković was president of the SPS's Novi Sad city committee in 1991–92. He was elected to the city assembly in the May 1992 Serbian local elections, the first to be held after the re-introduction of multi-party democracy in Serbia. On 30 June 1992, he was selected as assembly president; this position was at the time equivalent to mayor. His term came to an end on 13 January 1993, after the far-right Serbian Radical Party (Srpska radikalna stranka, SRS) made significant gains in Novi Sad in the December 1992 local elections.

He was elected to the national assembly in the 1992 Serbian parliamentary election, which was held concurrently with the December 1992 local elections. He received the second position on the SPS's electoral list in the Novi Sad division and won an automatic mandate when the list won nine seats. (From 1992 to 2000, Serbia's electoral law stipulated that one-third of parliamentary mandates would be assigned to candidates from successful lists in numerical order, with the remaining two-thirds distributed amongst other candidates on the lists at the discretion of the sponsoring parties.) The Socialists won a minority victory in the election and remained in power through an informal alliance with the far-right Serbian Radical Party (Srpska radikalna stranka, SRS). Divjaković took his seat when the new parliament met in January 1993.

The SPS's alliance with the SRS broke down later in 1993, and a new parliamentary election was held in December of that year. Divjaković was not a candidate for re-election.
