= Maja Gojković =

President of the Government of Vojvodina

- Маја Гојковић
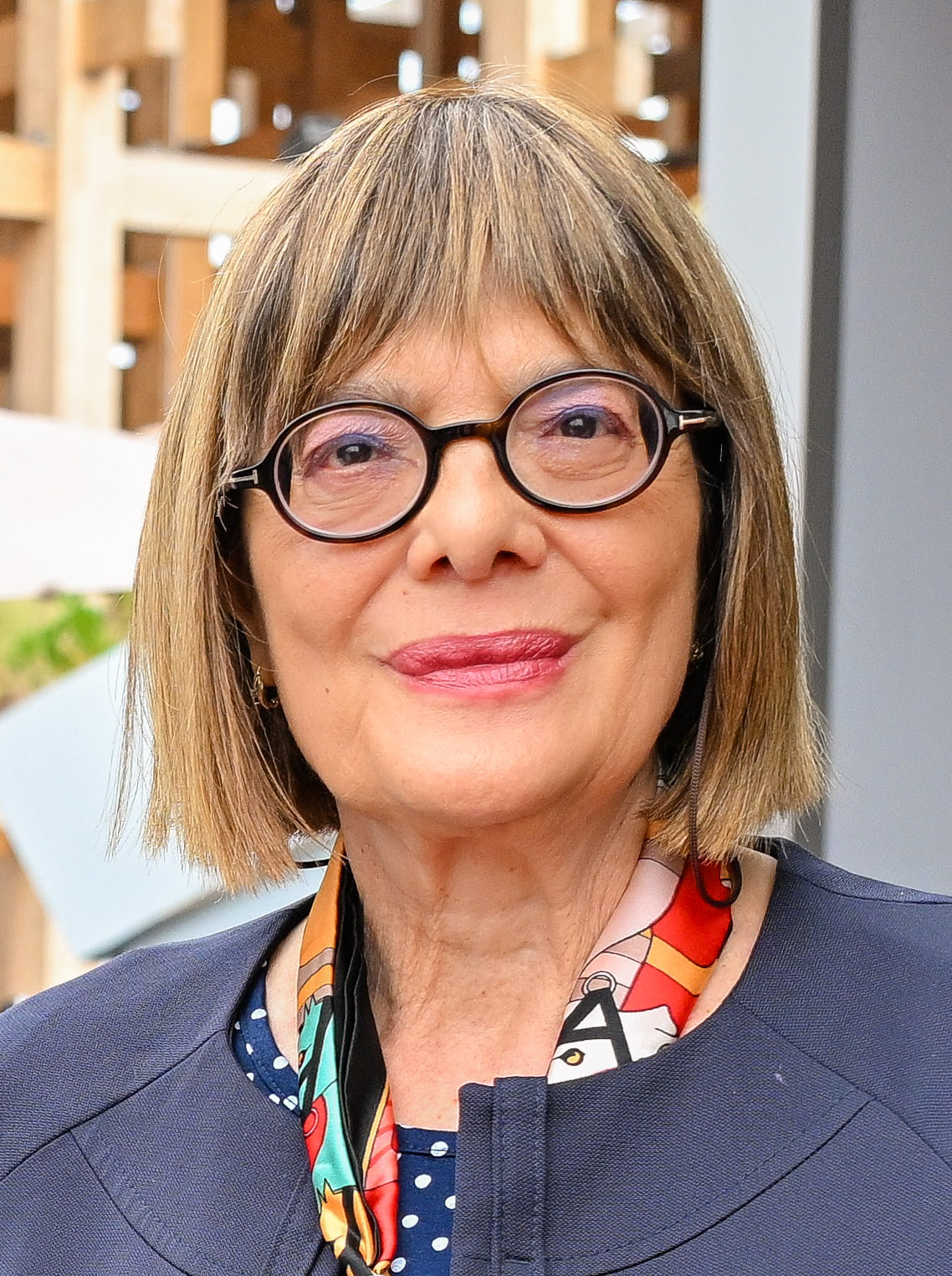
- Gojković in 2025

President of the Government of Vojvodina
- Incumbent
- Assumed office 8 May 2024
- Preceded by: Igor Mirović

Deputy Prime Minister of Serbia
- In office 28 October 2020 – 2 May 2024
- Prime Minister: Ana Brnabić
- Preceded by: Rasim Ljajić
- Succeeded by: Irena Vujović

Minister of Culture
- In office 28 October 2020 – 2 May 2024
- Prime Minister: Ana Brnabić
- Preceded by: Vladan Vukosavljević
- Succeeded by: Nikola Selaković

President of the National Assembly of Serbia
- In office 23 April 2014 – 3 August 2020
- President: Tomislav Nikolić; Aleksandar Vučić
- Preceded by: Nebojša Stefanović
- Succeeded by: Ivica Dačić

70th Mayor of Novi Sad
- In office 5 October 2004 – 16 June 2008
- Preceded by: Borislav Novaković
- Succeeded by: Igor Pavličić

Deputy Prime Minister of FR Yugoslavia
- In office 12 August 1999 – 4 November 2000
- President: Slobodan Milošević
- Prime Minister: Momir Bulatović
- Preceded by: Vuk Drašković
- Succeeded by: Miroljub Labus

Minister without portfolio
- In office 24 March 1998 – 11 November 1999
- President: Milan Milutinović
- Prime Minister: Mirko Marjanović

Personal details
- Born: 22 May 1963 (age 63) Novi Sad, SR Serbia, SFR Yugoslavia
- Party: NRS (1990–1991); SRS (1991–2008); NP (2008–2012); SNS (2012–present)
- Occupation: Politician
- Profession: Lawyer

Maja Gojković (Serbian Cyrillic: Маја Гојковић; born 22 May 1963) is a Serbian politician who has been the president of the Government of Vojvodina since 2024. A member of the Serbian Progressive Party (SNS), she previously served as president of the National Assembly from 2014 to 2020 and deputy prime minister of Serbia and minister of culture and information from 2020 until 2024.

As a member of the Serbian Radical Party (SRS), she served as minister without portfolio from 1998 to 1999 and Deputy Prime Minister of FR Yugoslavia from 1999 to 2000. She later became the mayor of Novi Sad, an office she served from 2004 to 2008, after which she left SRS and formed the People's Party (NP) which merged into SNS in 2012.

== Education ==
She attended Branko Radičević elementary school and the Gymnasium Jovan Jovanović Zmaj. After getting her degree from the University of Novi Sad Faculty of Law in 1987, she passed the bar exam in 1989. A year later she started working in her family's law firm.

== Political career ==
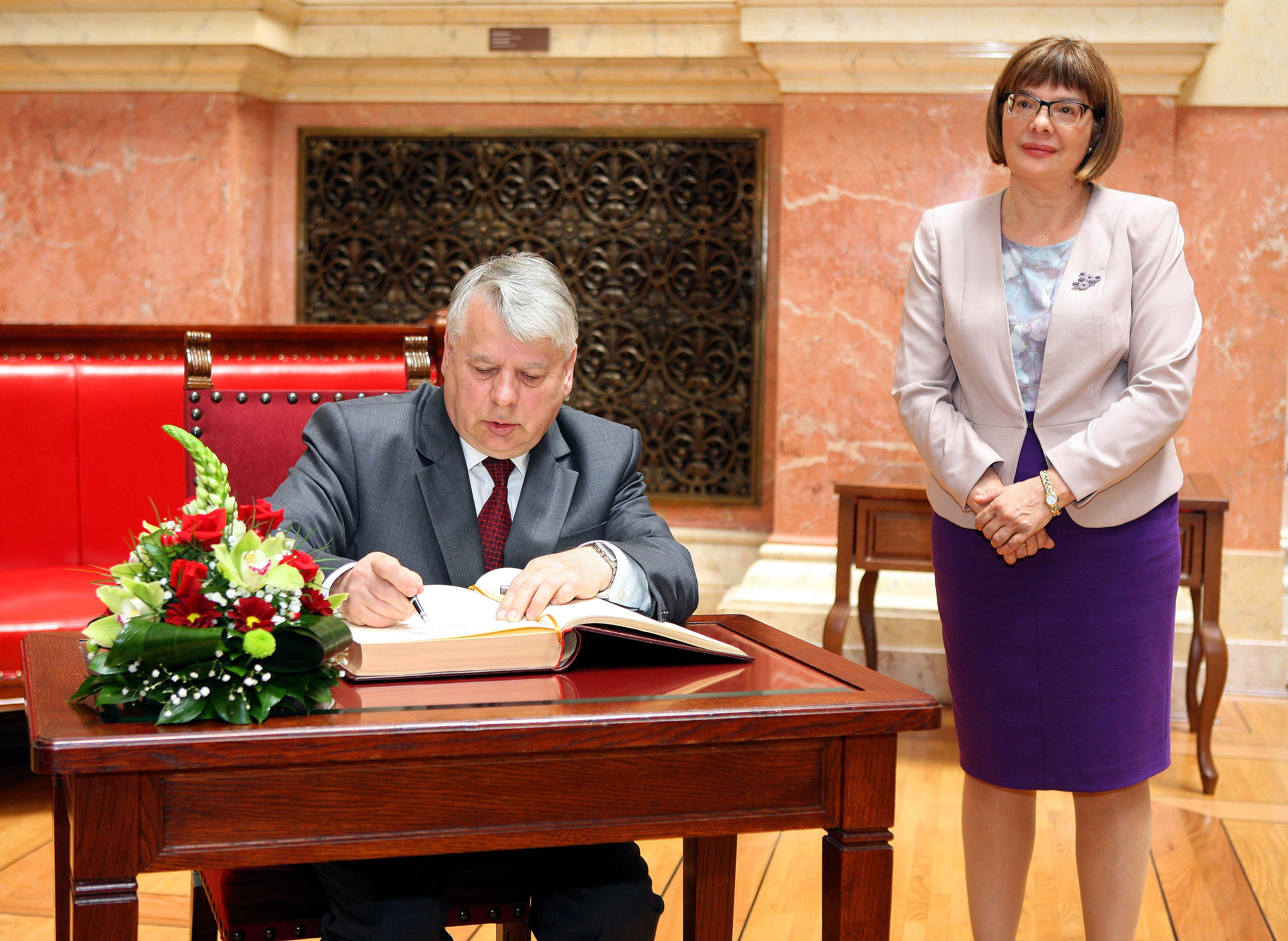
Maja Gojković and Bogdan Borusewicz in National Assembly of Serbia (2014)

Gojković is one of the founders of Serbian Radical Party, first holding the position of secretary general, then vice president of executive council and finally she was vice president of the party. She was Vojislav Šešelj's legal adviser before the International Criminal Tribunal for the former Yugoslavia.

On 14 July 1995, during the Bosnian War, Gojković, who served as vice-president of Serbian Radical Party, made a statement on the Fall of Srebrenica only a few days after the start of the massacre: “We salute the rapidly action of the Army of Republika Srpska, which finally liberated Serbian Srebrenica and put an end to one of the most significant hotspot of Muslim terror.”

Maja Gojković has been a representative in the parliament of the Federal Republic of Yugoslavia since 1992. From 1996 until 2000 she was a member of Vojvodina parliament. In 1998 and 1999 she was a non-portfolio minister in the Serbian Government. Gojković also served as vice chairman of the federal government of FR Yugoslavia in 1999. Before running for mayor of Novi Sad she held a place in the federal parliament of Serbia and Montenegro. She was the vice president of the Serbian Radical Party until 2006. In 2008, she formed her own party, the People's Party and ran for seats in the local elections. She got seven councillor seats in the Parliament of Novi Sad. In 2010, the People's Party joined the United Regions of Serbia (URS). For having supporting a coalition with Boris Tadić and his Democratic Party independently of the People's Party, she and other such members were expelled from the URS. The party is now defunct and she is a member of the ruling Serbian Progressive Party.

In the 2004 Serbian local election she was elected Mayor of Novi Sad, for the first time by popular vote, beating then mayor Borislav Novaković. She thus became the first woman to perform mayoral duties in Novi Sad's history.

She was elected President of the National Assembly of Serbia on 23 April 2014. In 2018, Freedom House reported that Gojković conducted parliamentary proceedings in an extremely partisan way, with a huge number of interruptions and penalties handed to opposition MPs. In addition, she was criticized for suggesting to MPs from ruling coalition to vote for initiatives and proposals by ringing a bell.

On 27 June 2020, Gojković was hospitalized with COVID-19.

Political offices
Preceded by Borislav Novaković	Mayor of Novi Sad; 2004–2008	Succeeded by Igor Pavličić
Preceded by Nebojša Stefanović	President of the National Assembly; 2014–2020	Succeeded by Ivica Dačić
Preceded by Vladan Vukosavljević	Minister of Culture; 2020–2024	Succeeded by Nikola Selaković
Preceded by Igor Mirović	President of the Government of Vojvodina; 2024–present	Incumbent
