= Jovan Dejanović (politician) =

Serbian politician (1927–2019)

Jovan Dejanovićć; Јован Дејановић

58th Mayor of Novi Sad
- In office 1974–1982
- Preceded by: Milan Čanak
- Succeeded by: Branislav Mindić

Personal details
- Born: 15 June 1927 Velebit, Kanjiža, Kingdom of SCS
- Died: 1 June 2019 (aged 91) Novi Sad, Serbia

Jovan Dejanović (Serbian Cyrillic: Јован Дејановић, 15 June 1927 – 1 June 2019) was a Serbian politician and former Mayor of the city of Novi Sad in two terms. He is remembered for a number of capital investments during his rule, including the building of Liberty Bridge, Serbian National Theatre, SPC Vojvodina and others.

Preceded by Milan Čanak	Mayor of Novi Sad; 1974–1982	Succeeded by Branislav Dejanović
