= Novi Sad City Hall =

City hall of Novi Sad, Serbia

- Градска кућа Gradska kuća Újvidéki Városháza; Novosadská Radnica; Новосадска Ратуша
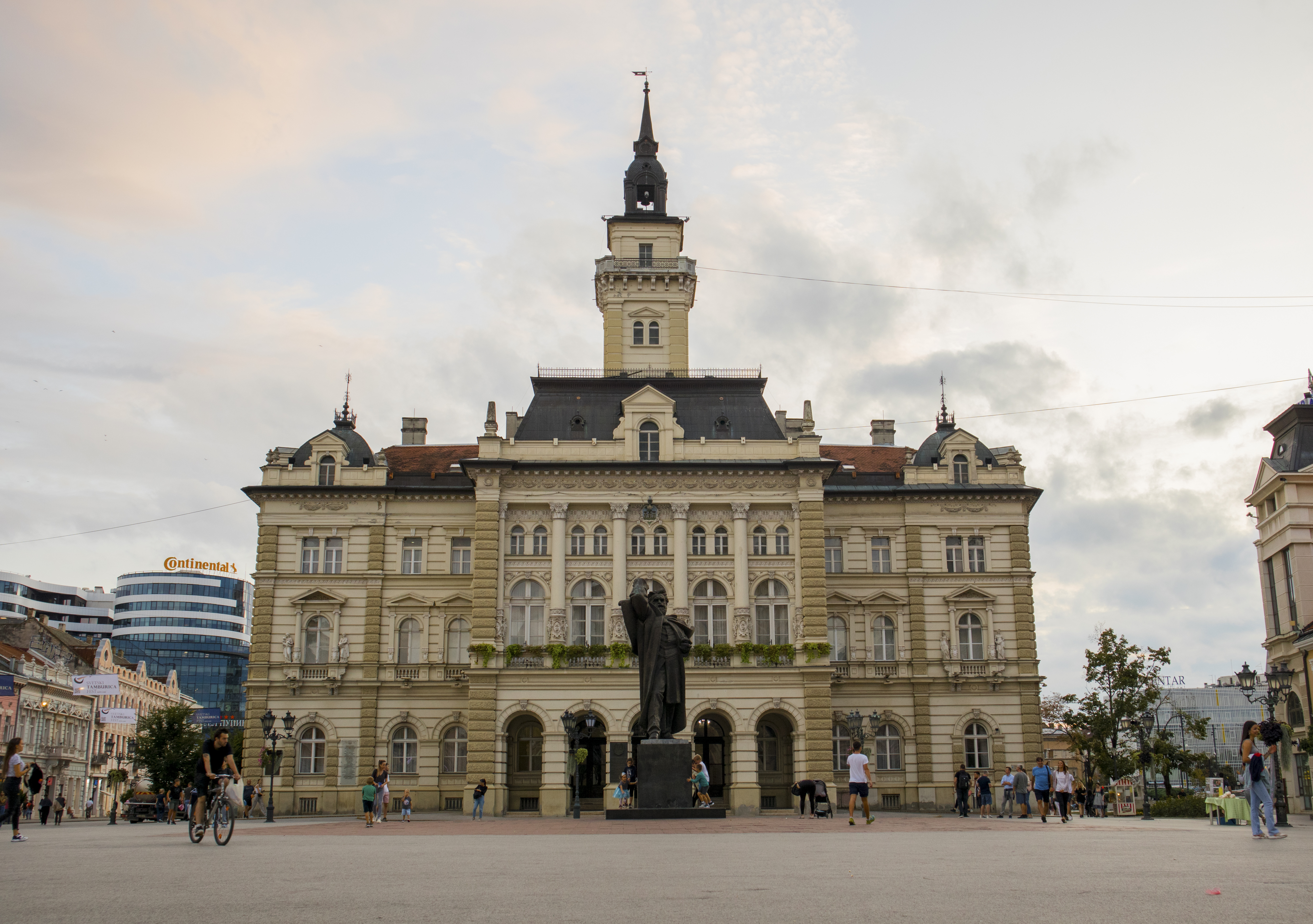
- Novi Sad City Hall, August 2023
- Interactive map of the Novi Sad City Hall area

General information
- Architectural style: Neo-Renaissance
- Location: Trg slobode 1, Novi Sad, Serbia
- Coordinates: 45°15′17.62″N 19°50′40.35″E
- Current tenants: City of Novi Sad
- Year built: 1893–1895
- Construction started: 27 February 1893; 133 years ago
- Completed: 3 January 1895; 131 years ago

Design and construction
- Architect: György Molnár
- Engineer: Karl Lerer; Jozef Cocek

Cultural Heritage of Serbia
- Type: Protected Cultural Monument
- Designated: 22 July 1997
- Reference no.: SК 1521

The Novi Sad City Hall (Serbian: Градска кућа, Gradska kuća, Hungarian: Újvidéki Városháza, Slovak: Novosadská Radnica, Pannonian Rusyn: Новосадска Ратуша) or the Magistrate is a neo-renaissance building housing the municipal institutions of Novi Sad, the capital of the autonomous province of Vojvodina, Serbia. Due to its heritage value, it is listed as a protected cultural monument of the Republic of Serbia. The building is located on Trg slobode (Freedom Square), in the Stari Grad (Old Town) district. The current building has been the center of the city administration for over 100 years while the institution of the Magistrate itself dates back to 1748, the year Novi Sad gained the status of a free royal city.

== History ==
=== 18th century ===
On 1 February 1748, Novi Sad gained the status of a royal free city of the Kingdom of Hungary within the Austrian Empire, yet it lacked an administrative building.

The Magistrate was first housed in the rented house of senator Peter Ferenci. The so-called Ferencijana (or Domus Ferenciana) was located at the site of the current city hall at the main city square. The Magistrate would move due to budgetary reasons to the adapted former Komora house (Kameralhaus), which was located at the site of the modern city postal building. The magistrate would be relocated again in 1786, as the location was deemed to far from the city center at the time, located next to a Jewish praying house and near the Mali Liman swamp lands. Another reason for the relocation was the land, where the Komora house was, had been ceded to the Armenian settlers for the construction of their own church and parish house, as well as the removal of the Jewish praying house on the remaining land (the Jewish prayer house would later move to the location of the modern Novi Sad Synagogue).

Up until 1895, the city's administration frequently relocated. At one point it was located in the old Iron Man Palace at the main city square. In 1852, it would move to Svojina Palace at Main street (modern Zmaj Jovina 4). In 1871, the location would be ceded to the Regional court and the Magistrate would move again to the Guard Barracks, located at the site of the modern Bazar shopping center.

=== 19th century ===
Finding a more permanent seat of the cities administration was a contentious issue, as evident by the numerous individual plans ordered throughout the early 19th century. The Budapest State Archives preserved a plan for the construction of the city hall from 1825, currently housed in the National Széchényi Library. There were also mentions of a project plan done by the engineer Lazar Urošević from 1838. Most of the earlier records, along with most of the city, were lost during the Bombing of Novi Sad on 12 June 1849 by Hungarian revolutionary forces.

The struggle over the position of the future Magistrate's building, with the national and political background already present, were been heating up, delaying the final preparations for construction. Political disputes arose over the location where the building should be built. In 1861, Svetozar Miletić proposed the Serbian National Theatre to be built on the current city hall site while relocating the hall to the Serb majority neighborhood at Hans plaza (the site of the modern Matica srpska building), while local Roman Catholic community insisted the hall should be placed on the main square, opposite the Name of Mary Church, where the hall was ultimately built after 20 years of dispute.

In 1869, the Committee for the Construction of the new city hall (Rathaus, Városház) was established. The following year the Committee, announced in all the Serbian and German newspapers at the time, would call for an official tender for the city hall design plans. The most significant moment in the construction history of the city hall was the period between 1873–1874, when a smaller, internal competition was organised for the building. In 1873, Titelbach's plans were rejected as they were deemed incomplete. By next year, the committee would buy plans from György Molnár for a sum of 400 forint. There are no surviving records of what Molnár's original plan looked like.

Taking the form from the larger cities of the Monarchy, the Novi Sad City Administration, through the Construction Committee, and adhering to the city ordinances in early 1885, organised another public competition in which 32 works would arrived. The competition papers were received in code. The most notable projects were those of Budapest architects and builders, which were also the most numerous. There were also local builders, such as the famous local builder Jozef Cocek, who designed the building in a Neo-Baroque style, which the committee criticized for having an overly ornate façade. An exhibition of the works was held in May of the same year in the grand hall of the old Magistrate.

Since the commission did not select any of the submitted works as a final (performing) project, it was suggested that the first three authors be invited to put together a new project together with an architectural commission chosen by the city. Since the commission was not able to re-organise the drawing up of the plans with the bidders, it was decided that György Molnár's plans of a more restrained Neo-Renaissance façade should be selected, with the plans being amended by using Jozef Coceks original work. Molnár made the alterations very quickly and informed the Committee of this. The official decision was made as early as the autumn of 1885, when it was announced that the City Committee entrusted the preparation of the plans as well as the supervision of the masonry itself to the local architect György Molnár for a total sum of 300 forints.

On 27 February 1893, The Board of Directors decided to begin construction of the Magistrate on the purchased land from the Stefanović family. Demolishing of the Stefanović family house, build in 1852 in a neo-classical style, caused great dissatisfaction and indignation among the citizens who stood up for it. Then a large number of signatures were collected on the petition to preserve the building, but these attempts were unsuccessful and the city authorities remained steadfast in their intentions. The first council session in the new building was held in 1894.

The building was completed in 1895. It was modeled after the Graz City Hall in Styria, Austria. On 3 January 1895, the first meeting of the Assembly was held in the ceremonial hall, which would later be the gathering spot for the famous Novi Sad balls that lasted until the end of the Second World War.

=== 20th century ===
In 1907, the firefighters of Novi Sad would place a bell at the top of the city hall's tall tower. The bell named Matilda by the locals, had an iron relief of Saint Florian, patron saint of firefighters, and was used to herald fires visible from the tower's vantage point from all across the city. The bell would be use all the way to the Second World War went it would be melted down by the Hungarian occupying force.

In 1911, Emperor Franz Joseph I of Austria would ceremoniously visit Novi Sad and its city hall, while King Alexander I of Yugoslavia would visit in 1919 and 1933, both as regent and as king respectively.

On 22 July 1997, the city hall would be registered as a Protected Cultural Monument of the Federal Republic of Yugoslavia and later Serbia.

On 1 February 1998, several iron plaques were placed on the front façade and on the arcade entrance of the building. The left arcade plaque is for the mayor's office written in four official languages used in the City of Novi Sad (Serbian, Hungarian, Slovak, and Rusyn), while the right one is a short historic summary for the City and the city hall written in Serbian. The façade plaque showcases all the twin towns and cities at the time, such as Modena, Norwich, Dortmund, Changchun, Ilioupoli, and Budva. Timișoara, Nizhny Novgorod, Pécs, and Toluca were added later to the plaque in 2015. The façade plaque would later be replaced by a glass one in the early 2020s, updated frequently with newer twin and partner city additions.

=== 21st century ===
On 13 June 2003, protests over the arrest of Montenegrin Serb officer in the Yugoslav People's Army Veselin Šljivančanin were organized by the members of the Serbian Radical Party at Freedom Square in Novi Sad, leading to clashes with the police, with at least fifty police officers injured. Projectiles and red paint were thrown at the city hall, vandalizing the exterior and interior of the building, as well wrecking several parked vehicles at the square. Among the protesters were Aleksandar Vučić, Aleksandar Vulin, and Tomislav Nikolić. None of the protesters were apprehended at the time.

On 5 November 2024, protests over the canopy collapse disaster that occurred at the Novi Sad railway station were held in front of the railway station and other locations in Novi Sad such as Freedom Square, leading to clashes with police and at least twelve people, ten of whom were police officers, being injured. Projectiles and red paint were thrown at the regional offices of the ruling Serbian Progressive Party and later at the city hall, vandalizing the exterior and interior of the buildings. At least nine people were arrested, along with the former president of Inđija municipality Goran Ješić, member of Bravo movement Miran Pogačar, and member of Heroes movement Miša Bačulov. The incident prompted a visit by Serbian president Aleksandar Vučić.

== Characteristics ==
The representative neo-renaissance palace with the tower is one of the most beautiful and representative buildings in the city. The front façade is owned by a protruding avant-corps with strong columns decorated with plaster stucco and an arcade on the ground floor. The center of the building is designed as an atrium space, which in modern times was covered and transformed into an administrative area. The façade of the palace, especially the window frames of the first floor feature beautiful allegorical figures of Greek goddesses. The sculptures were made by local sculptors Julije Anika and Jovan Kistner. On all four corners of the palace there are four-flux domes partially sheltered by low atoms, and above the avant-corps is a penthouse flat roof. The building is dominated by a tall tower with a balcony on which is placed a replica of the Matilda bell from 1907. The courtyard façade of the building is simple, with no decorative elements, with a series of windows that allow daylight to the upstairs corridors. The layout of the premises within the facility is in the administrative business function. From a crisscrossed hall with pillars on the ground floor, a representative staircase with a walled balustrade leads to the first floor. The ceremonial hall on the first floor has a taped ceiling, with richly decorated walls with stucco-decorations and painted compositions by the local painter Pavle Ružička from 1911. The wall compositions show a variety of human activities, such as field work, chimney factories, hay wagons, craft making, and trade. After the Second World War, one of the paintings was replaced by the state coat of arms. The building is well preserved and maintained throughout the centuries.

== In popular media ==
Square of Violence is an American drama film shot in Novi Sad in 1961. The film is set in Italy during the Second World War, with major events shot at Freedom Square in Star Grad neighborhood, along with several scenes inside the city hall.

== Gallery ==
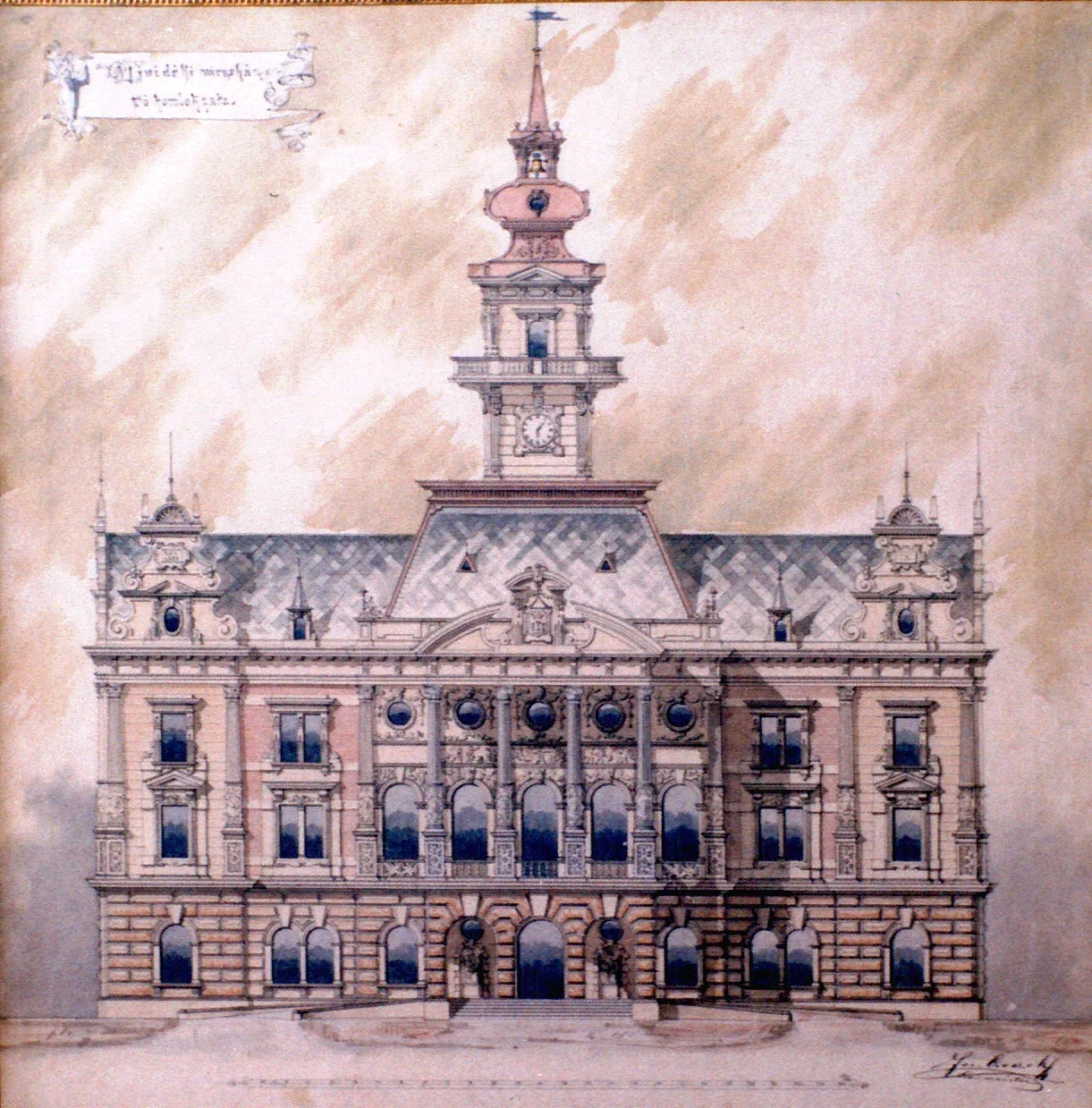
Proposed plan for City Hall in Novi Sad by Jozef Cocek, 1890

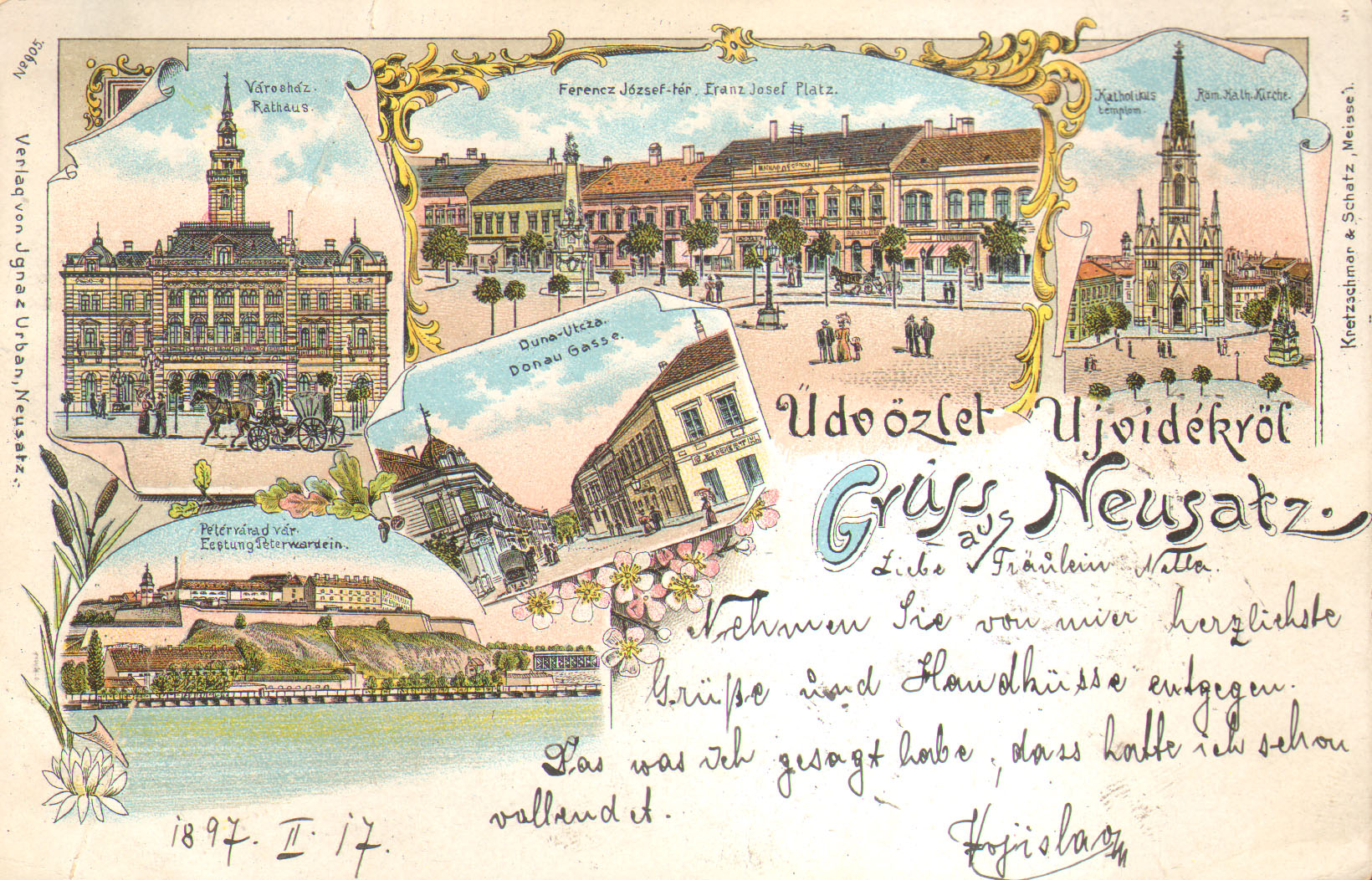
Postcard of Novi Sad, 1897

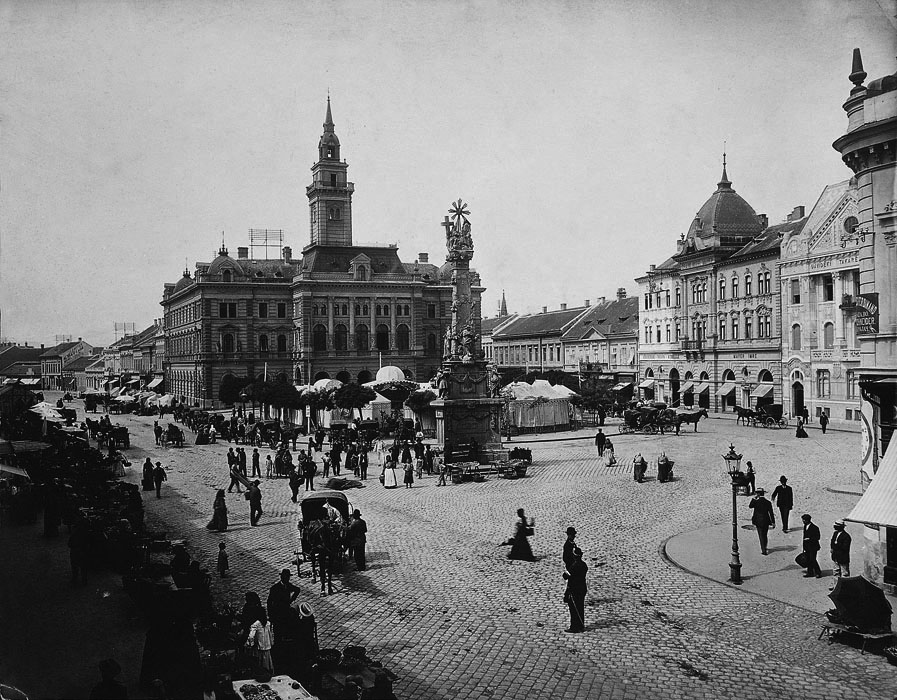
City Hall at Franz Joseph Square (now Freedom Square), 1900

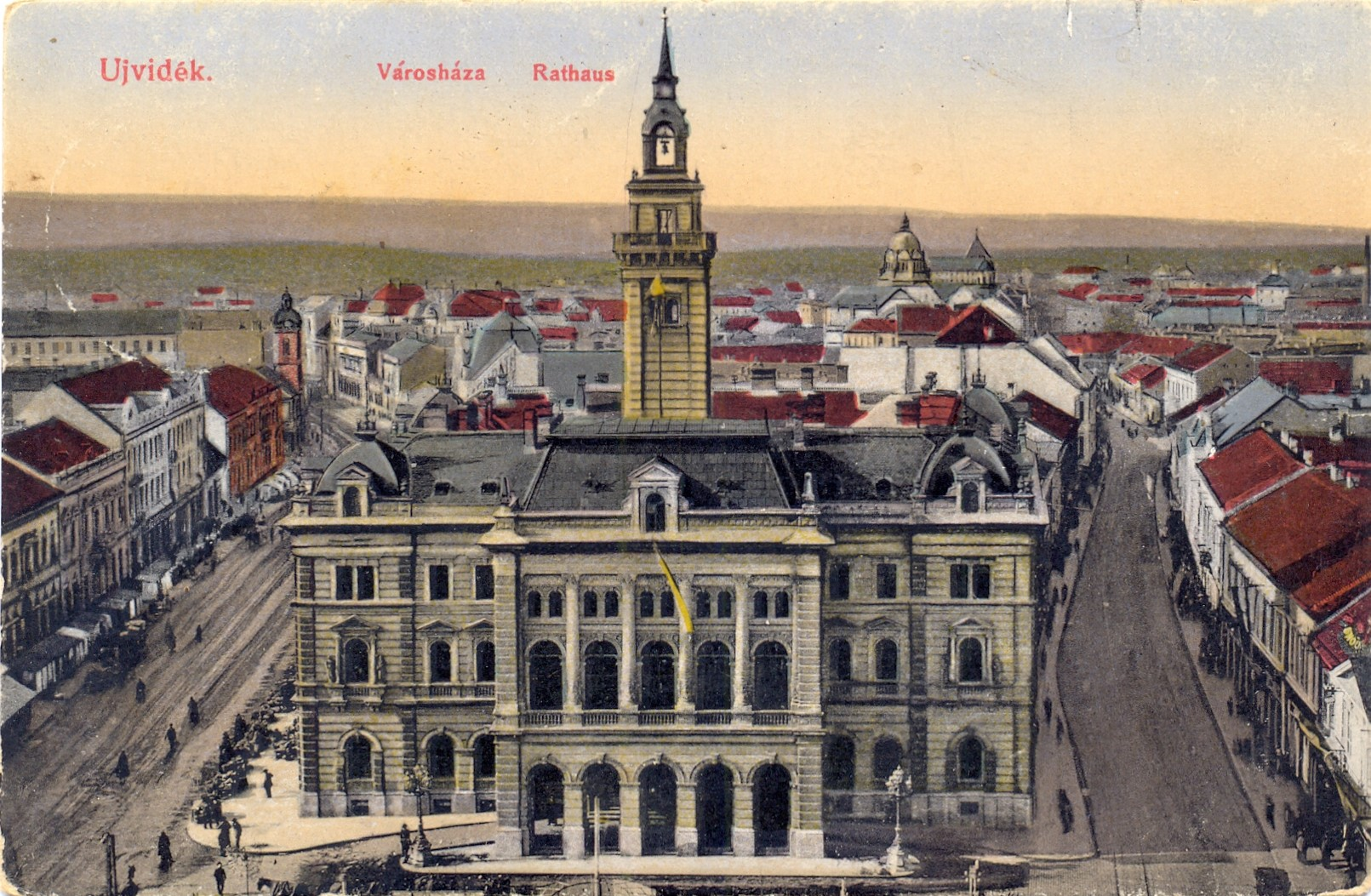
Postcard of City Hall, 1917

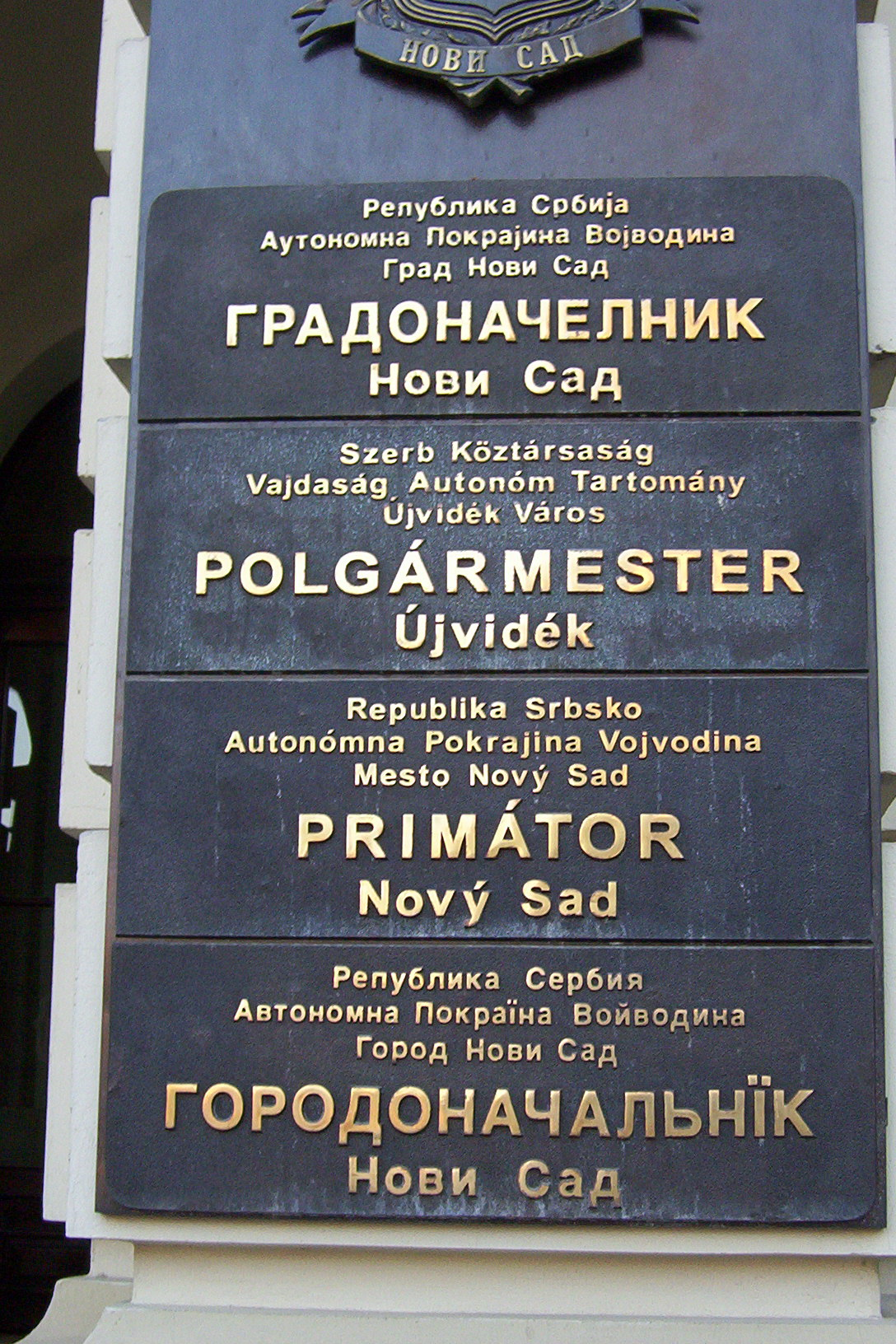
Mayor office written in Serbian, Hungarian, Slovak, and Rusyn, November 2006

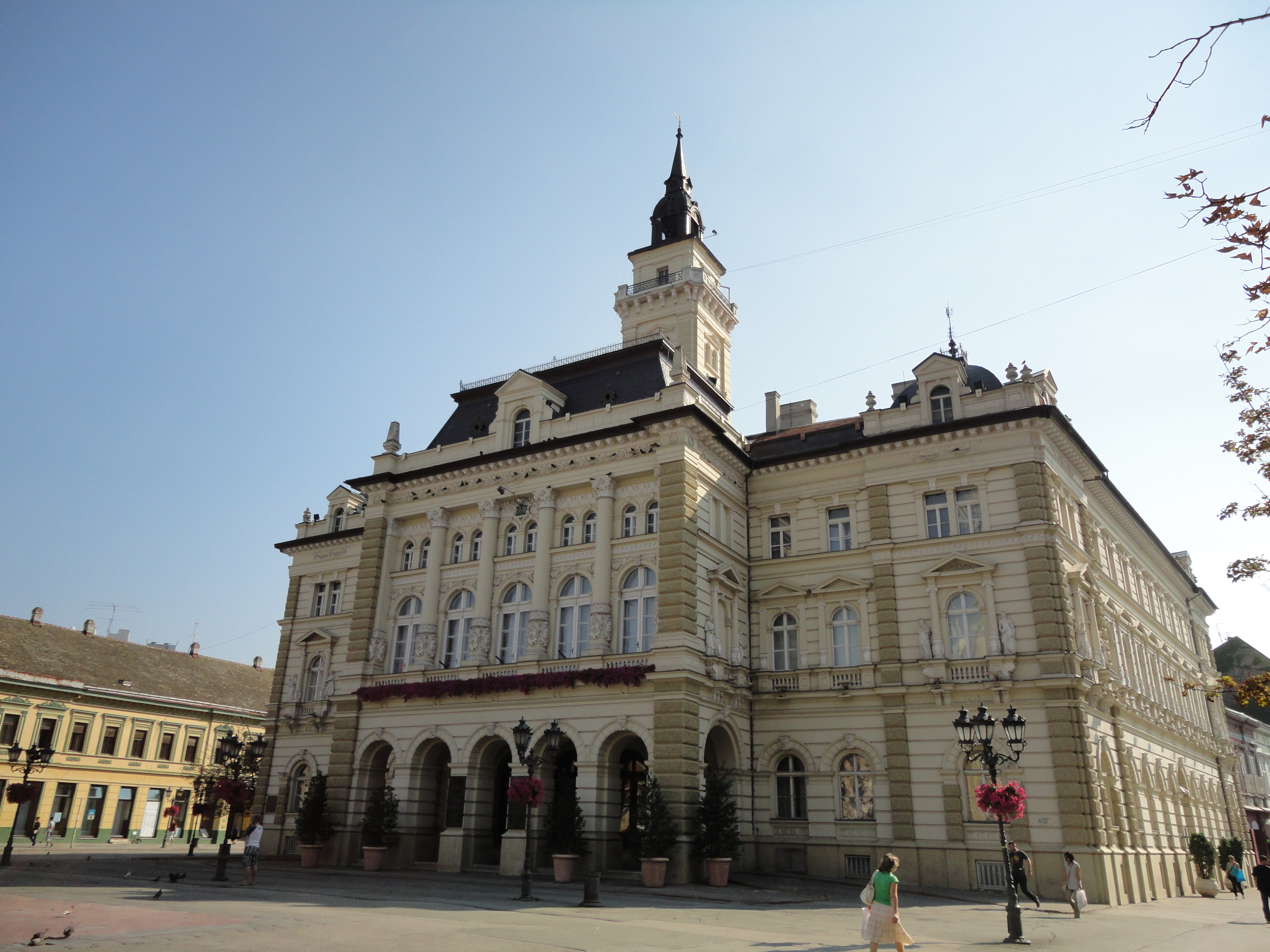
City Hall, July 2010

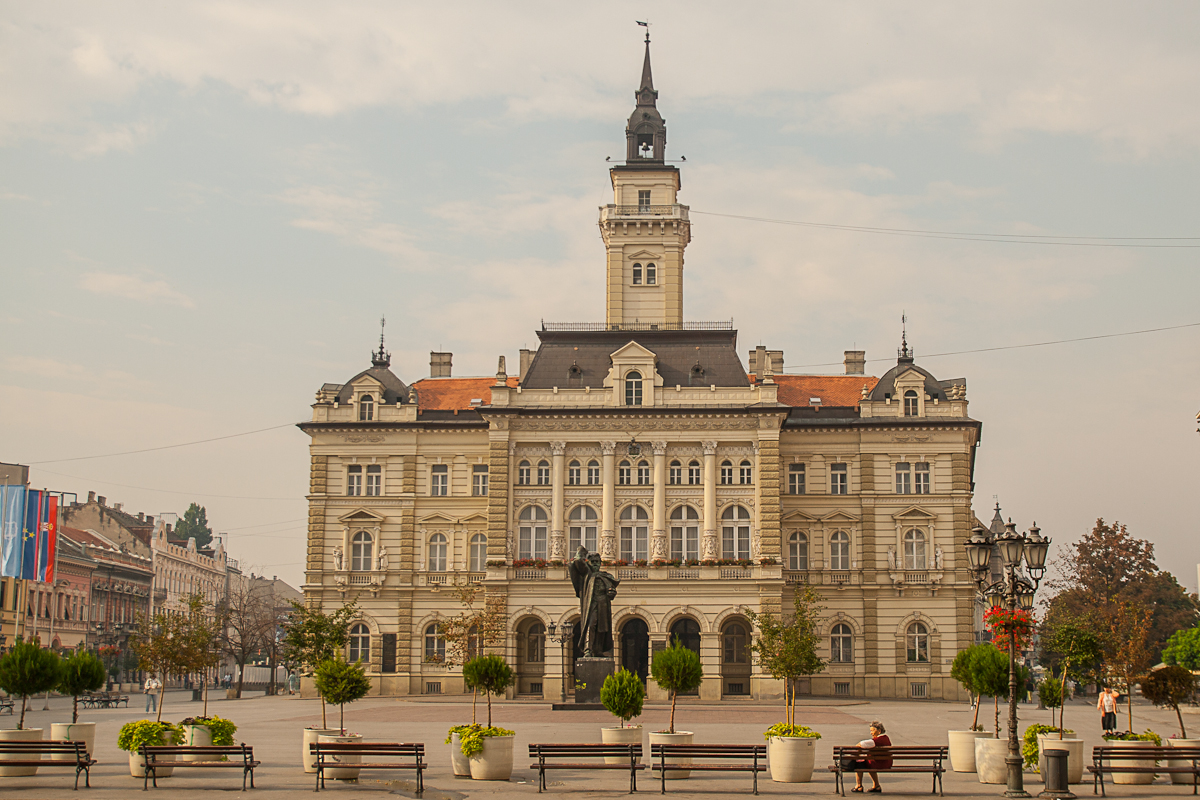
City Hall, September 2012

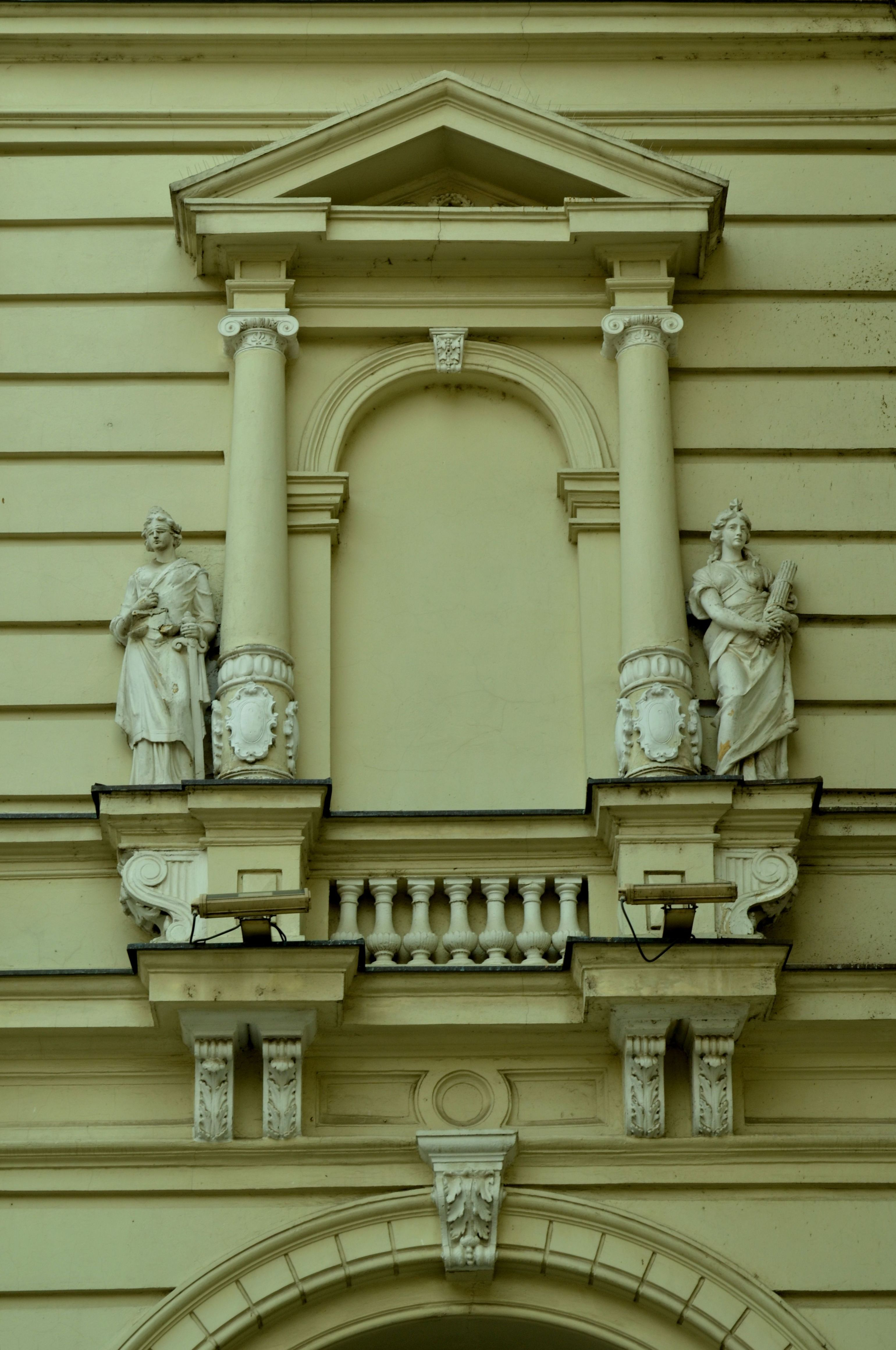
City Hall façade details, September 2012

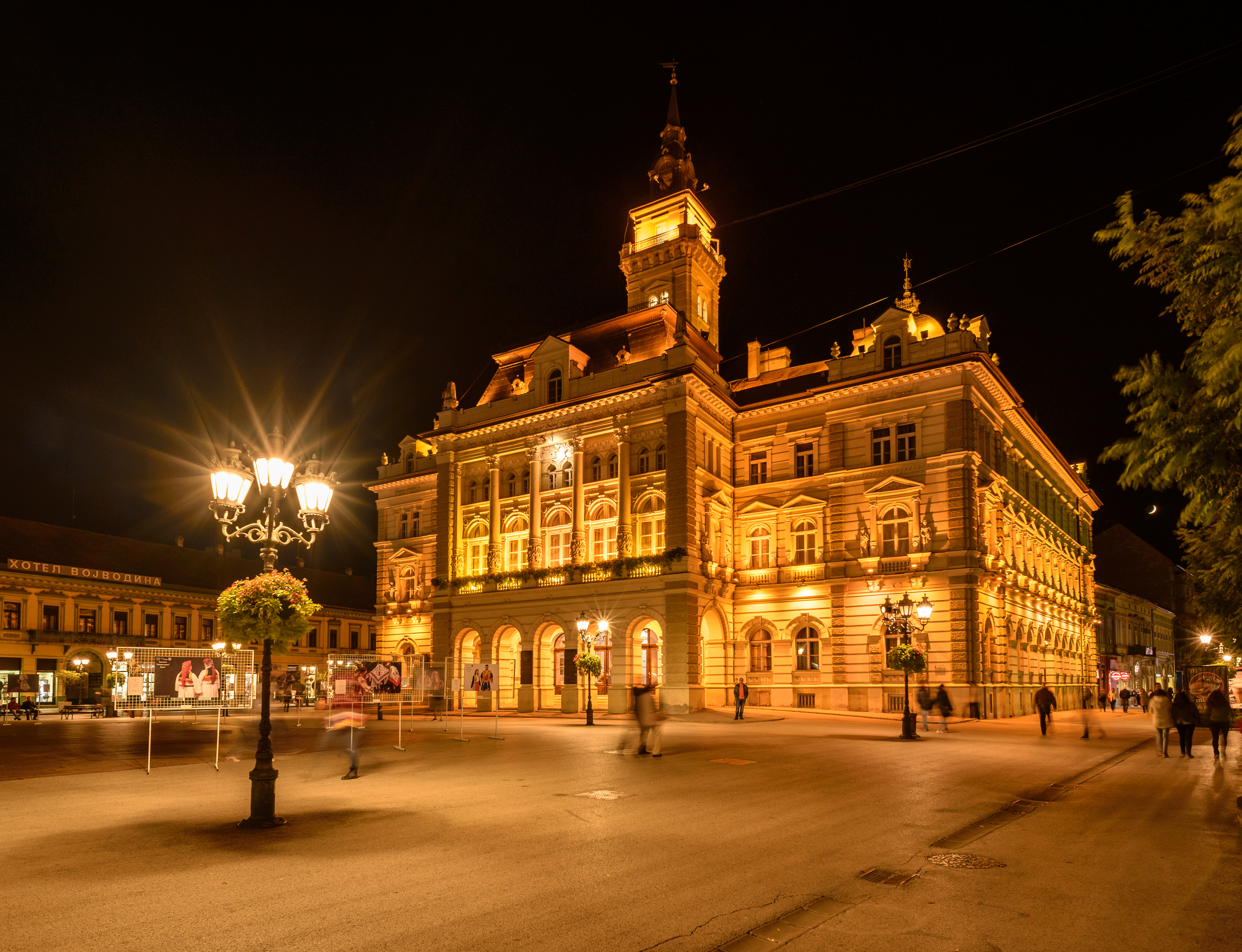
City Hall at night, October 2016

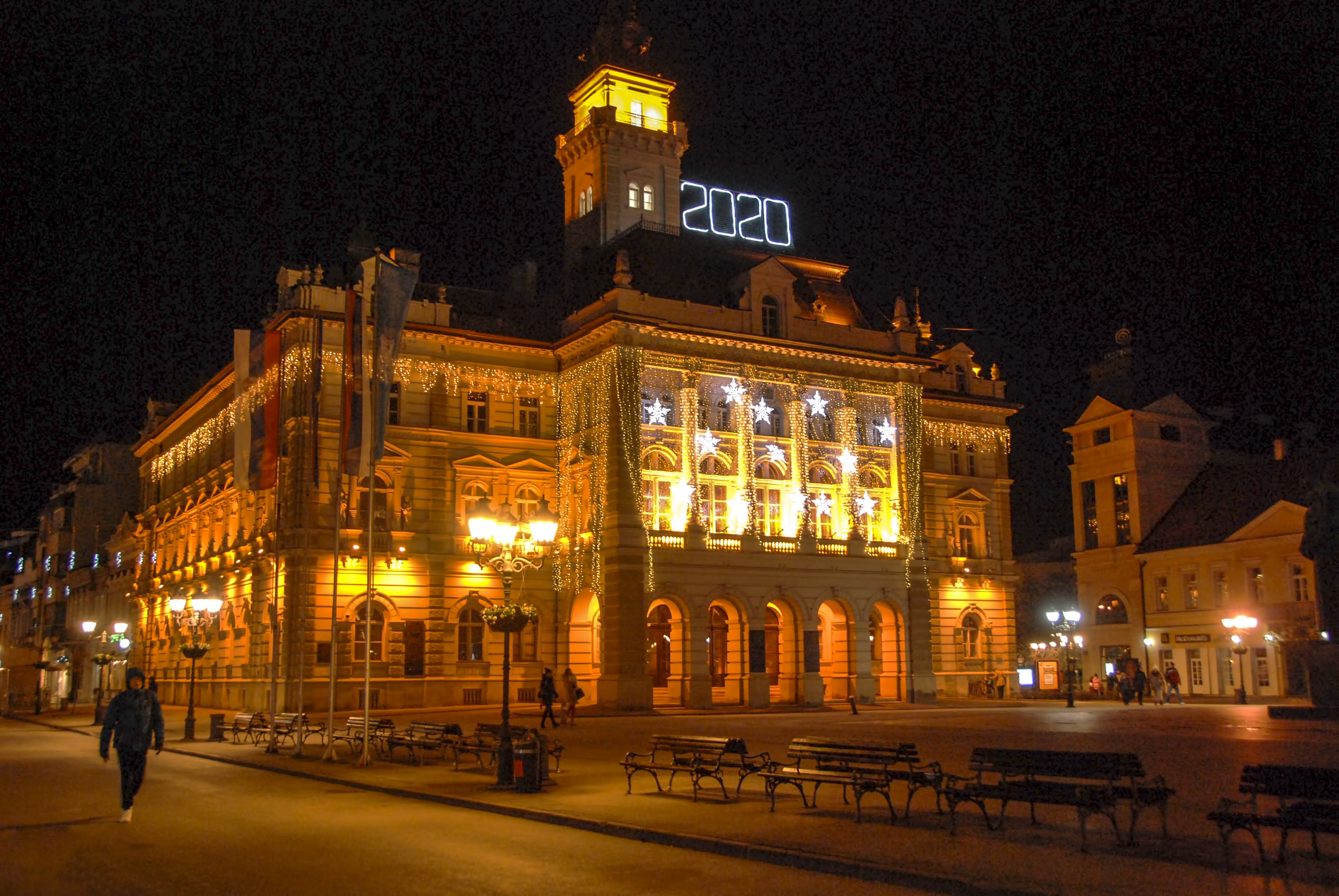
City Hall at night, December 2019

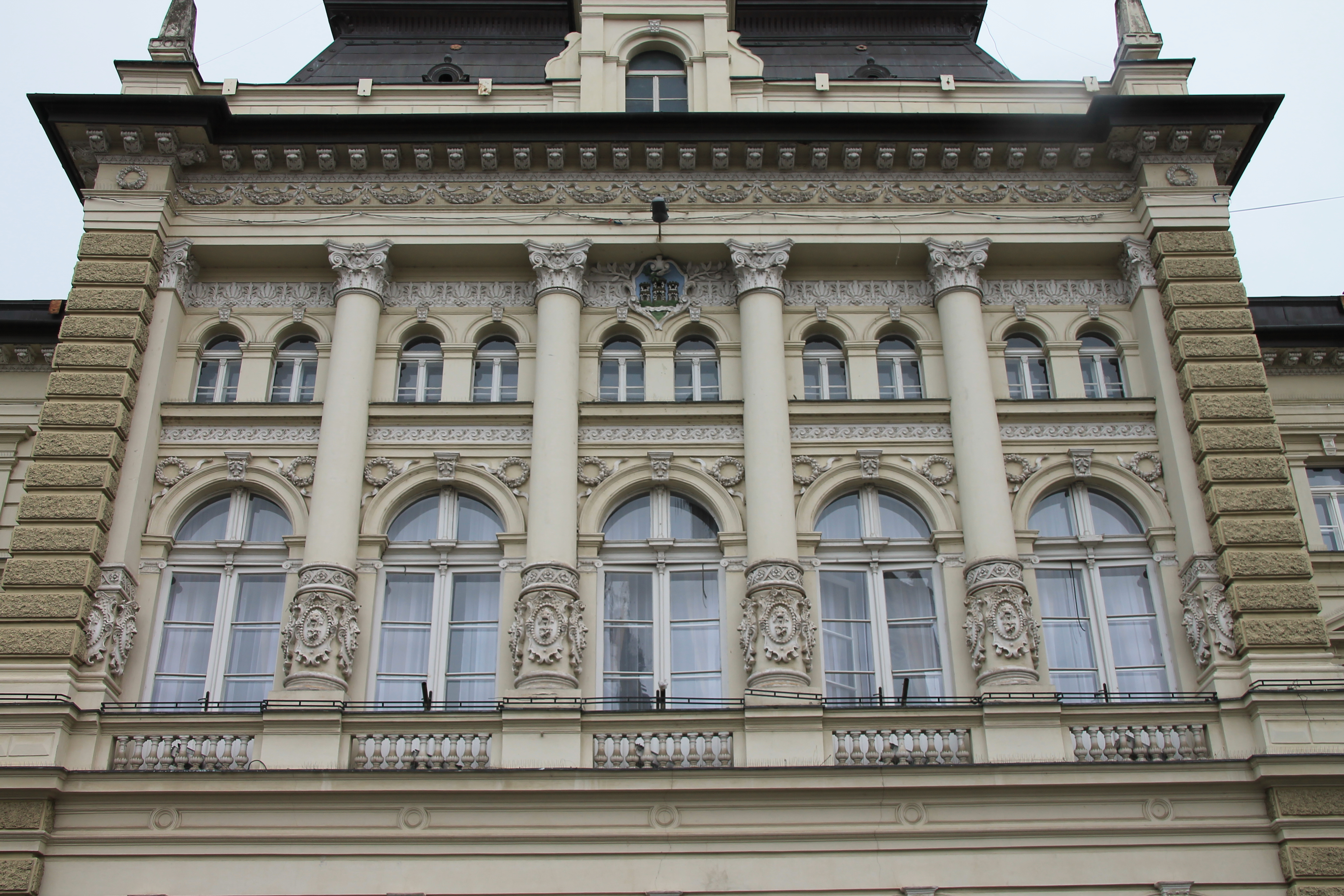
City Hall façade details, May 2020

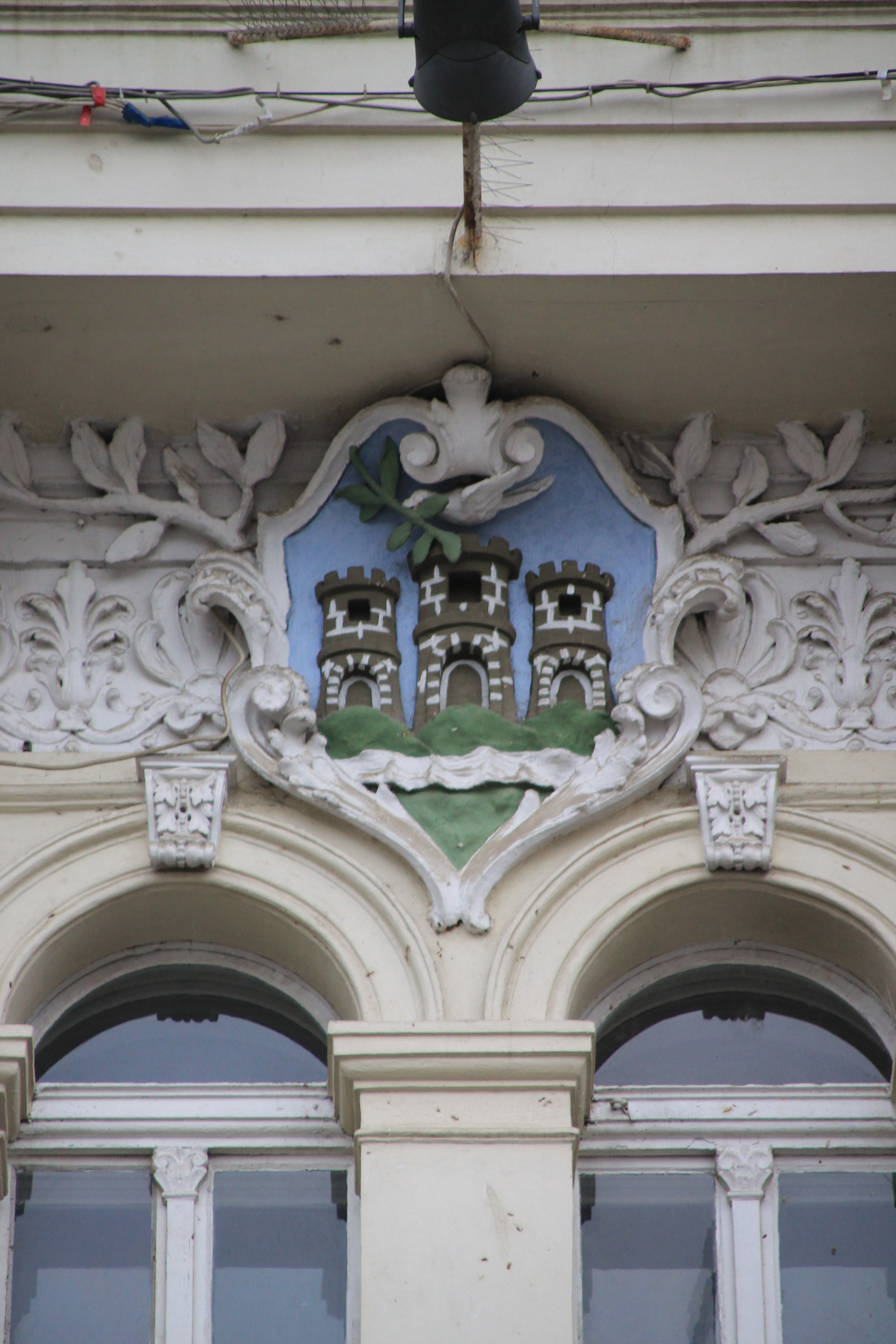
City coat of arms on City Hall, May 2020

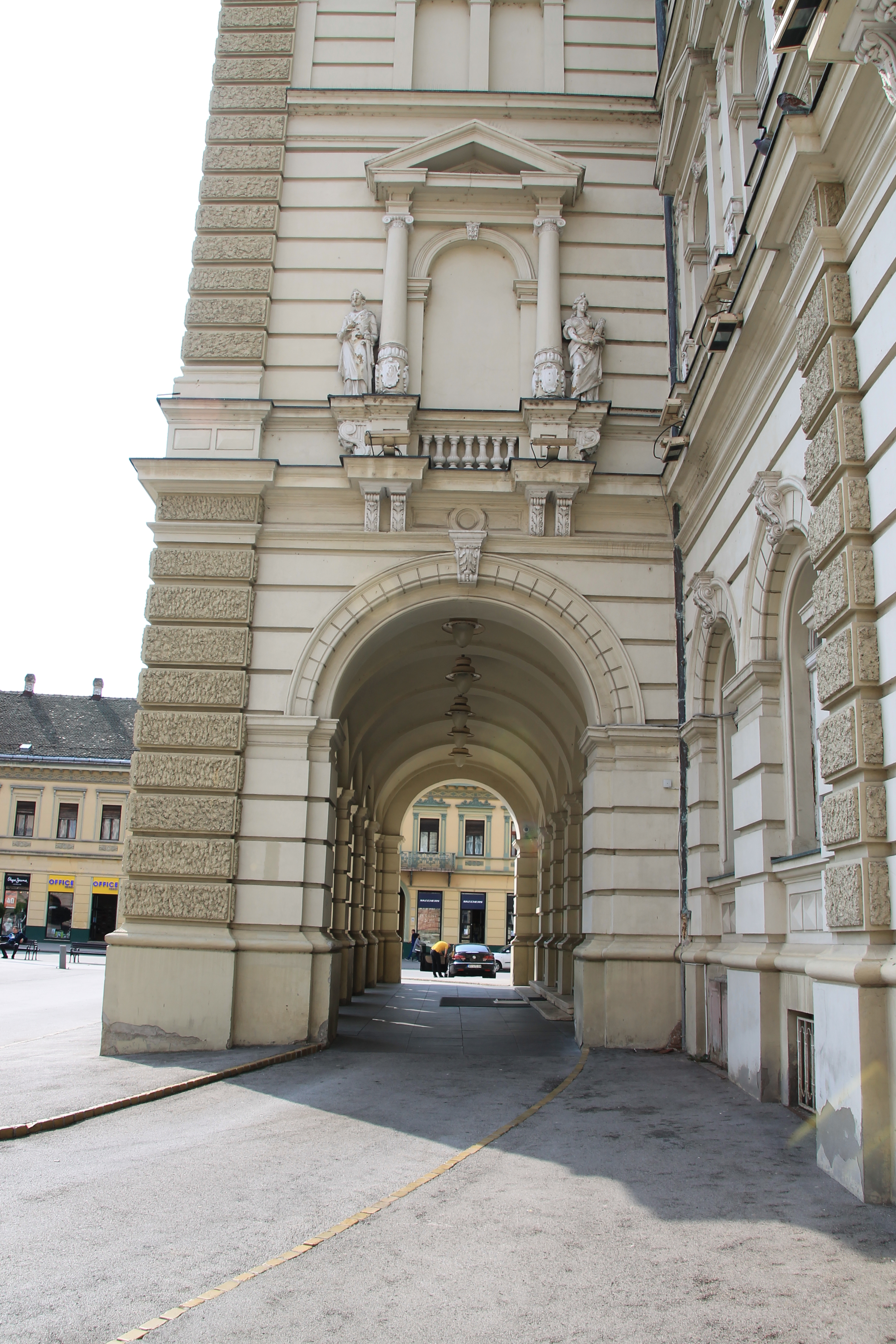
City Hall entrance passage, June 2020

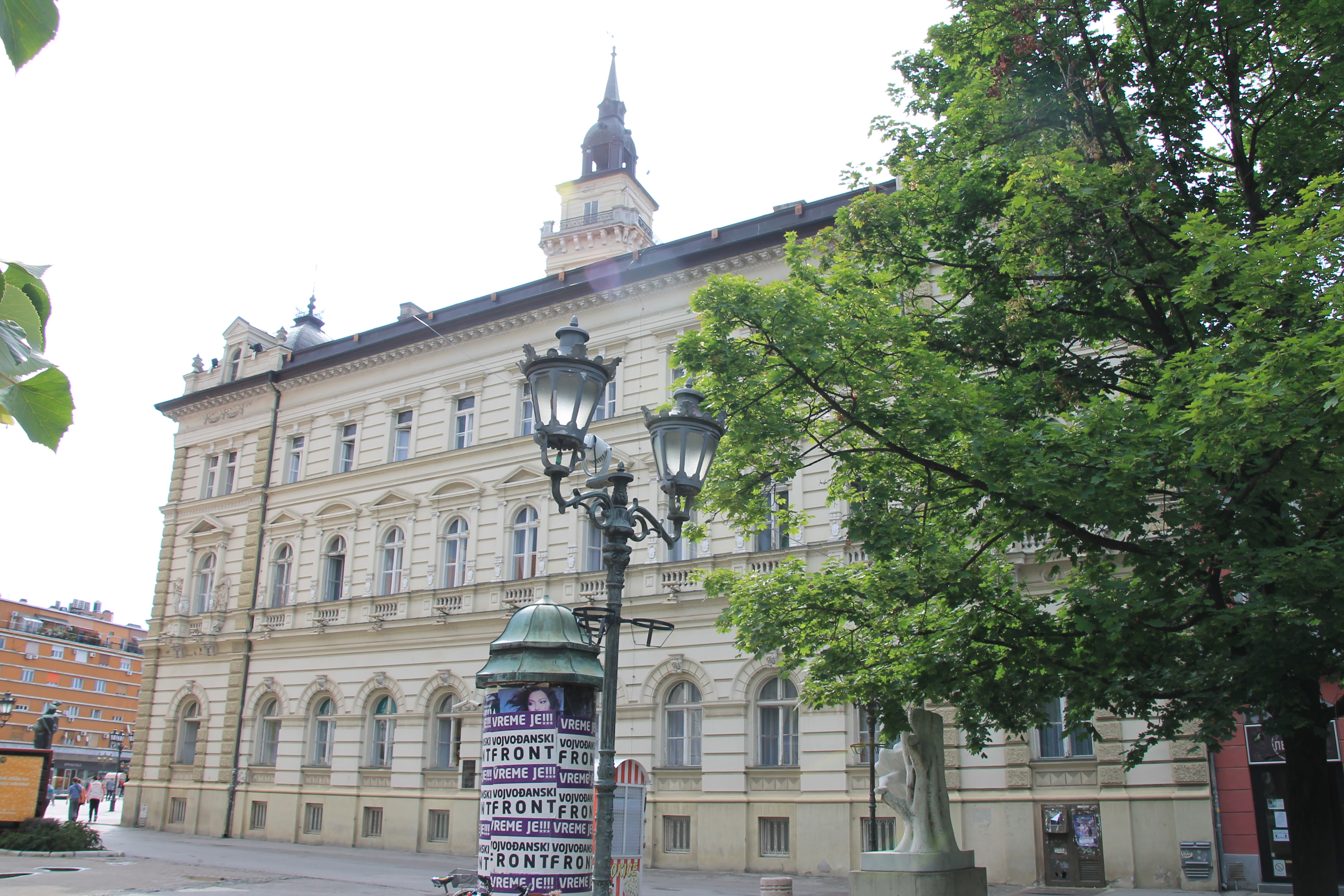
City Hall from Pozorišni Trg (Theater Square), June 2020

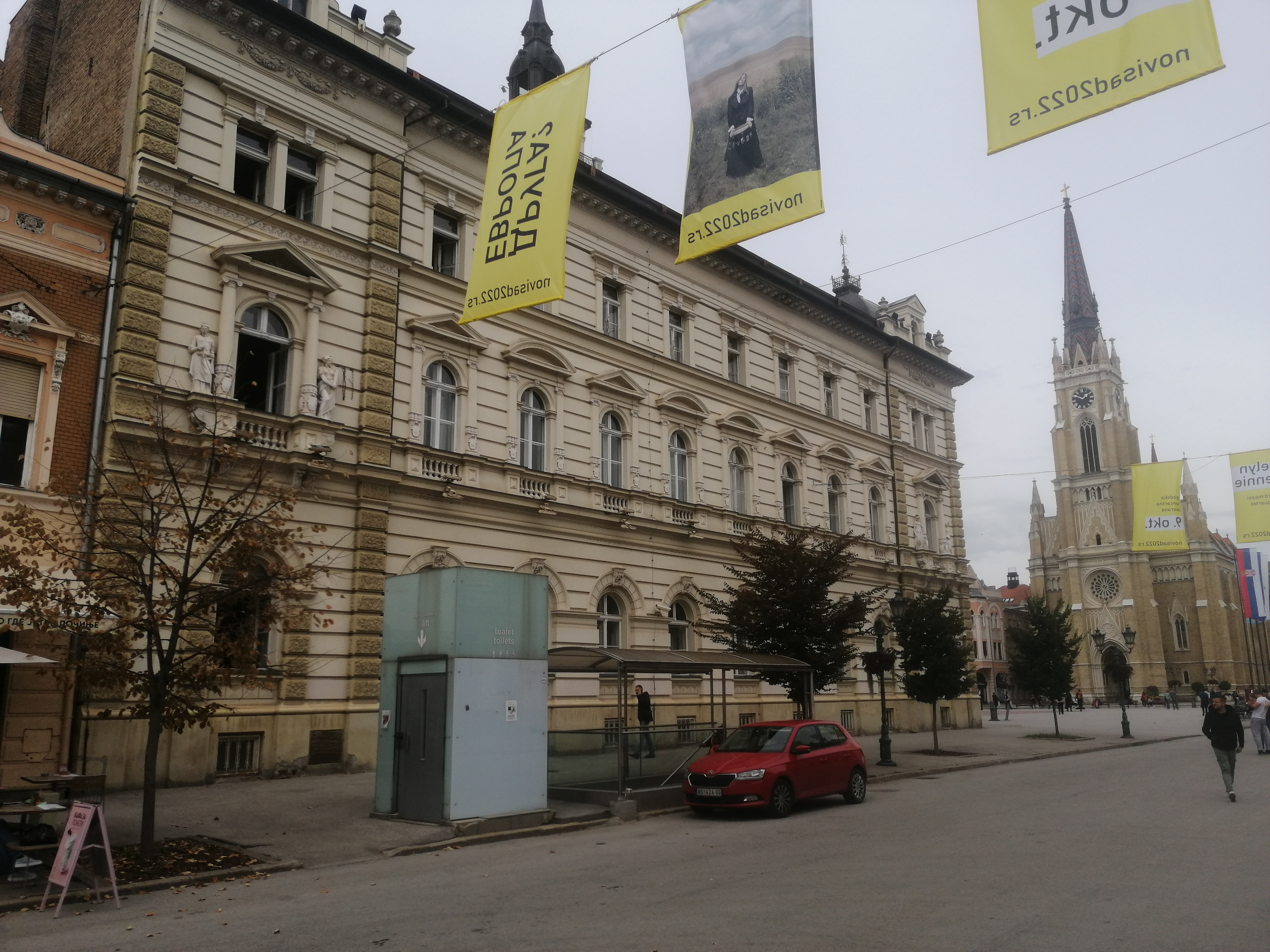
City Hall from Kralja Aleksandra street, September 2020

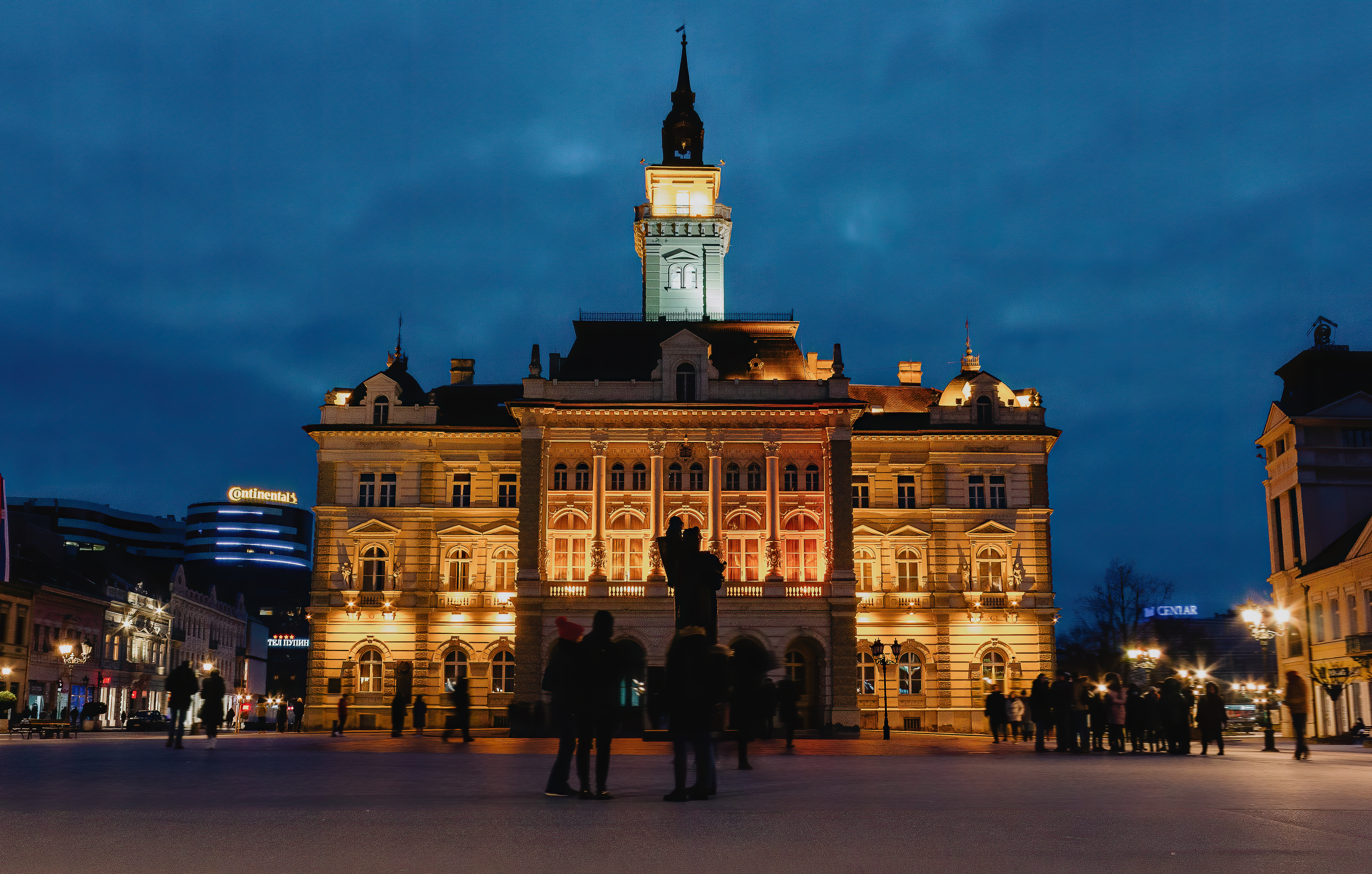
City Hall at night, February 2021

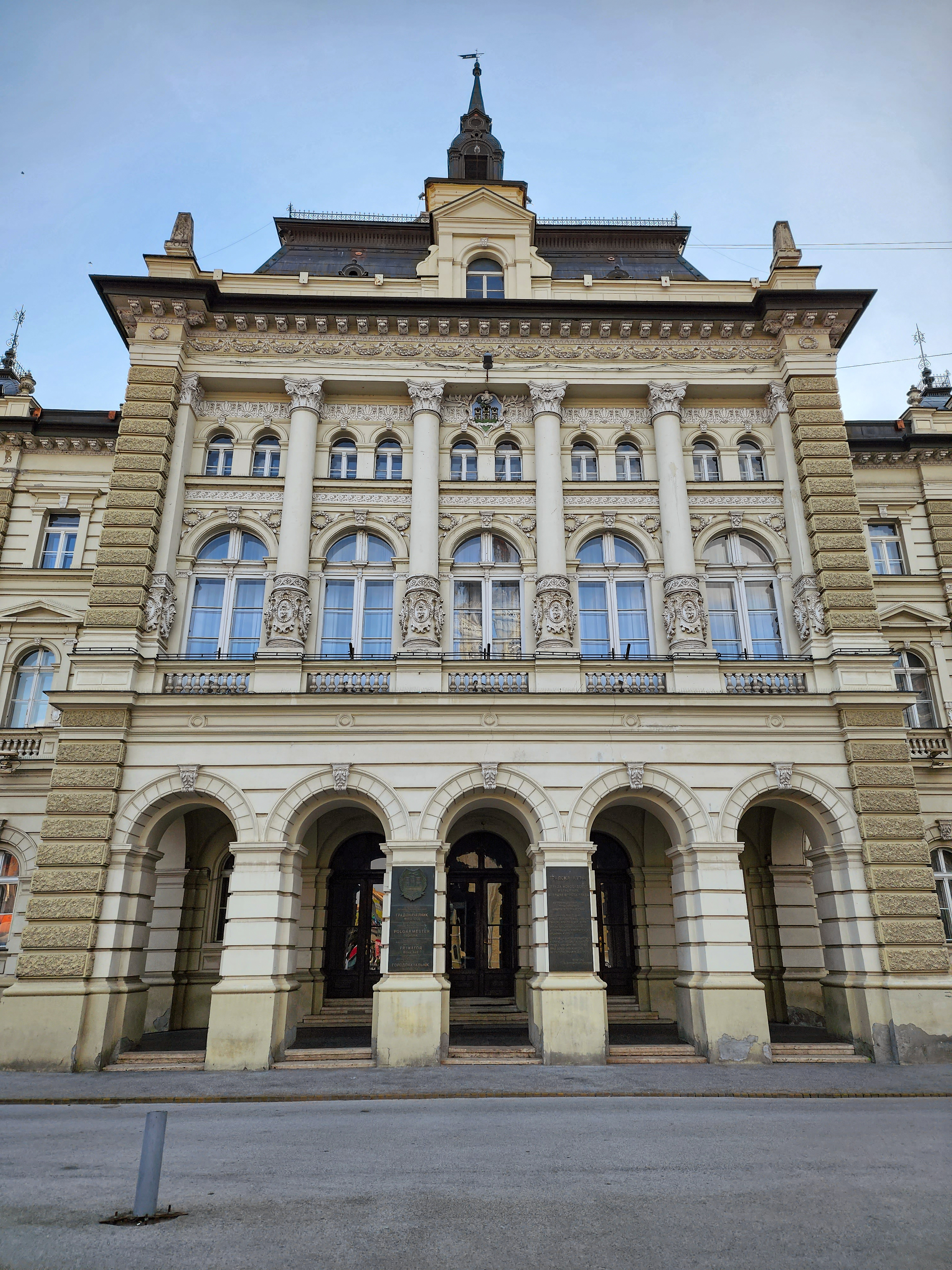
City Hall main entrance, October 2022

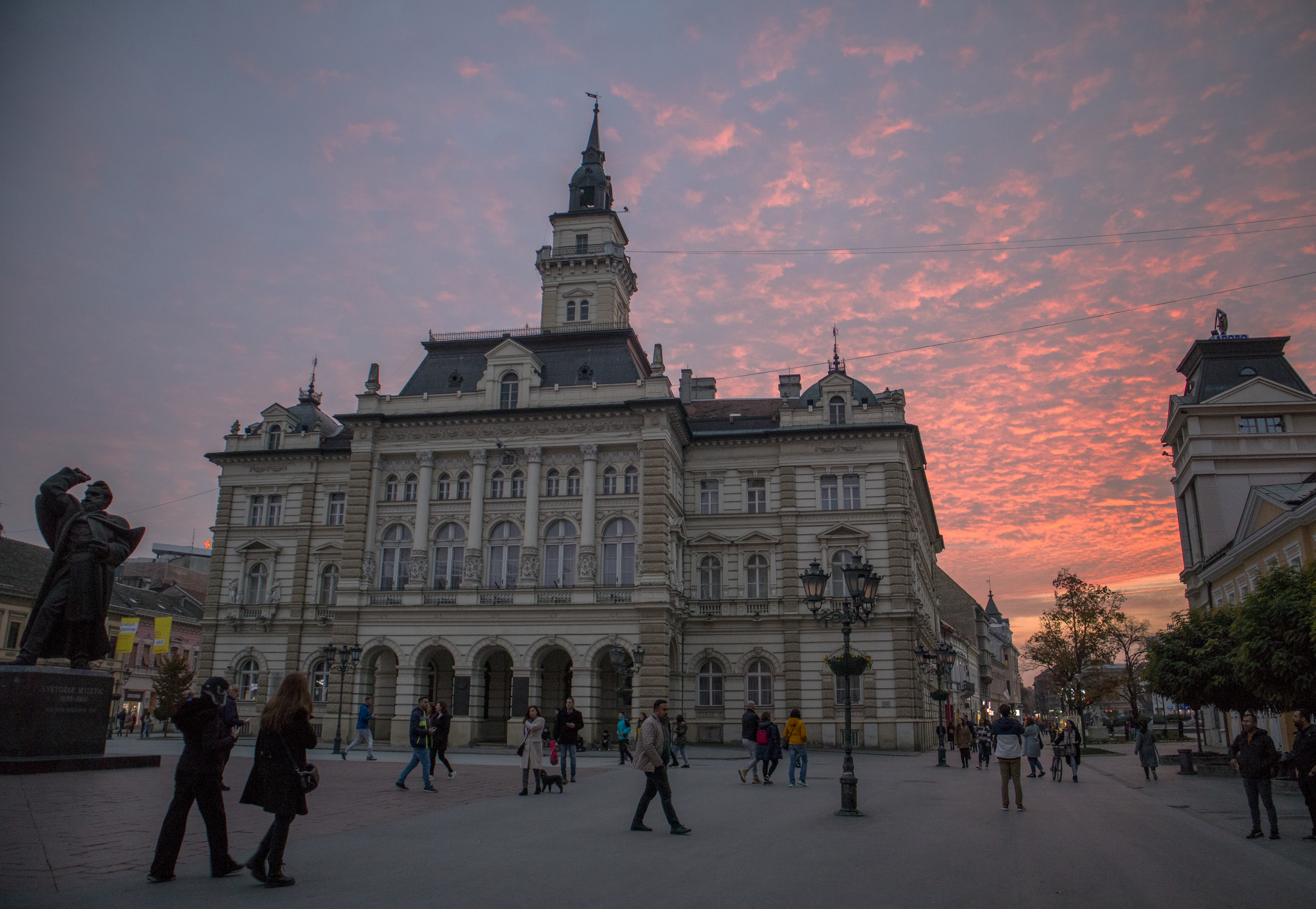
City Hall, November 2022

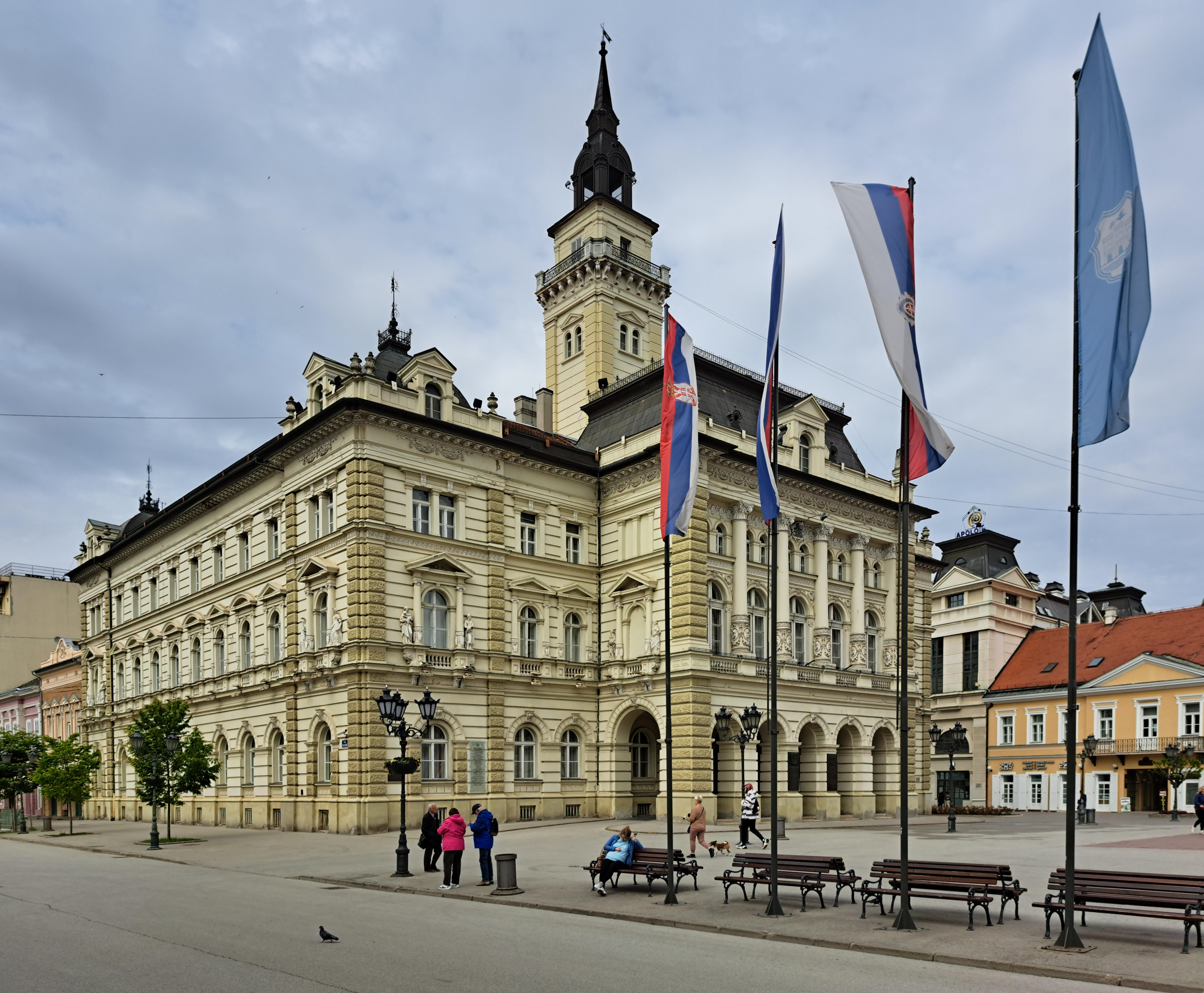
City Hall, April 2023

== See also ==
- Stari dvor
- Banovina Palace
- Subotica City Hall
