= Mihajlo Svilar =

Serbian politician

Mihajlo Svilar (Serbian Cyrillic: Михајло Свилар; 1947–April 2013) was a politician in Serbia. He was a member of the National Assembly of Serbia from 1994 to 1997 and served as mayor of Novi Sad from 1996 to 1997. For most of his time in public life, Svilar was a member of the Serbian Renewal Movement (Srpski pokret obnove, SPO).

== Early life and career ==
Svilar was born in the village of Bački Brestovac in the Odžaci municipality, Autonomous Province of Vojvodina, in what was then the People's Republic of Serbia in the Federal People's Republic of Yugoslavia. He was raised in the Salajka neighbourhood of Novi Sad and graduated from the Faculty of Economics at Subotica. He later worked as the commercial director of the packaging company AMB Grafika for six years and as its general director for nine years. During the hyperinflation period of the 1990s, he applied what were described as Japanese-influenced business practices at the factory.

== Politician ==
Svilar joined the SPO on the re-introduction of multi-party politics in Serbia in 1990. The SPO formed the Democratic Movement of Serbia (Demokratski pokret Srbije, DEPOS) coalition of opposition parties in 1992, and Svilar appeared in the fifth position on the coalition's electoral list for Novi Sad in the December 1992 Yugoslavian parliamentary election. The list won two seats in the division, and he was not returned. He was, however, elected to the Novi Sad city assembly in the concurrent Serbian local elections. The far-right Serbian Radical Party (Srpska radikalna stranka, SRS) emerged as the dominant force in Novi Sad's government after the election, and the DEPOS members served in opposition.

Svilar was given the lead position on the DEPOS's list for Novi Sad in the 1993 Serbian parliamentary election and was elected when the list won four mandates. (From 1992 to 2000, Serbia's electoral law stipulated that one-third of parliamentary mandates would be assigned to candidates from successful lists in numerical order, while the remaining two-thirds would be distributed amongst other candidates on the lists at the discretion of the sponsoring parties. Svilar received an automatic mandate by virtue of leading the list.) The Socialist Party of Serbia (Socijalistička partija Srbije) won the election; the DEPOS coalition dissolved shortly after the vote, and the SPO served in opposition at this level of government as well.

The SPO contested the 1996 Serbian local elections in a coalition with the Democratic Party (Demokratska stranka, DS) and other parties, known collectively as Zajedno (English: Together). The alliance won a majority victory in Novi Sad; Although the state authorities challenged opposition victories in several other jurisdictions, they permitted the results in the city to stand. Svilar was chosen as president of the city assembly in December 1996; at the time, this position was equivalent to mayor.

Svilar gave an interview in early 1997 criticizing the limited nature of the city government's powers; he noted that, after two months in office, he had not yet managed to book a meeting with the chief of police, who answered not to the city but to central authorities in Belgrade. He said that he was planning a revitalization of museums and cultural institutions and the launch of independent media institutions in the city.

His term in office was ultimately brief. In April 1997, he gave a press conference in which he threatened to resign from the SPO if certain issues between the party and the Zajedno coalition were not settled. Separately, he alluded to high levels of corruption in city affairs (including the earmarking of 150,000 German marks for bribes to city officials) and said that he wanted nothing to do with such matters. SPO leader Vuk Drašković called on Svilar to resign as mayor the following month, and he ultimately stepped down on 18 June.

Svilar sought re-election to the national assembly in the 1997 Serbian parliamentary election as the leader of an independent list in Novi Sad. The list received few votes and no seats. His term in the assembly ended when the new parliament convened in late 1997. At the end of the year, he was involved in the creation of a new party called SPO–Zajedno, which later became New Serbia (Nova Srbija, NS).

He apparently reconciled with the SPO after this time, as he contested the 2000 Yugoslavian parliamentary election at the head of the party's list in Novi Sad. The list did not cross the electoral threshold to win any seats in the division. He resigned from the party after the election, saying it no longer had any leading figures who would fight for its founding principles. He does not seem to have returned to political life after this time.

== Death ==
Svilar died in April 2013.
