= Slavija (Novi Sad) =

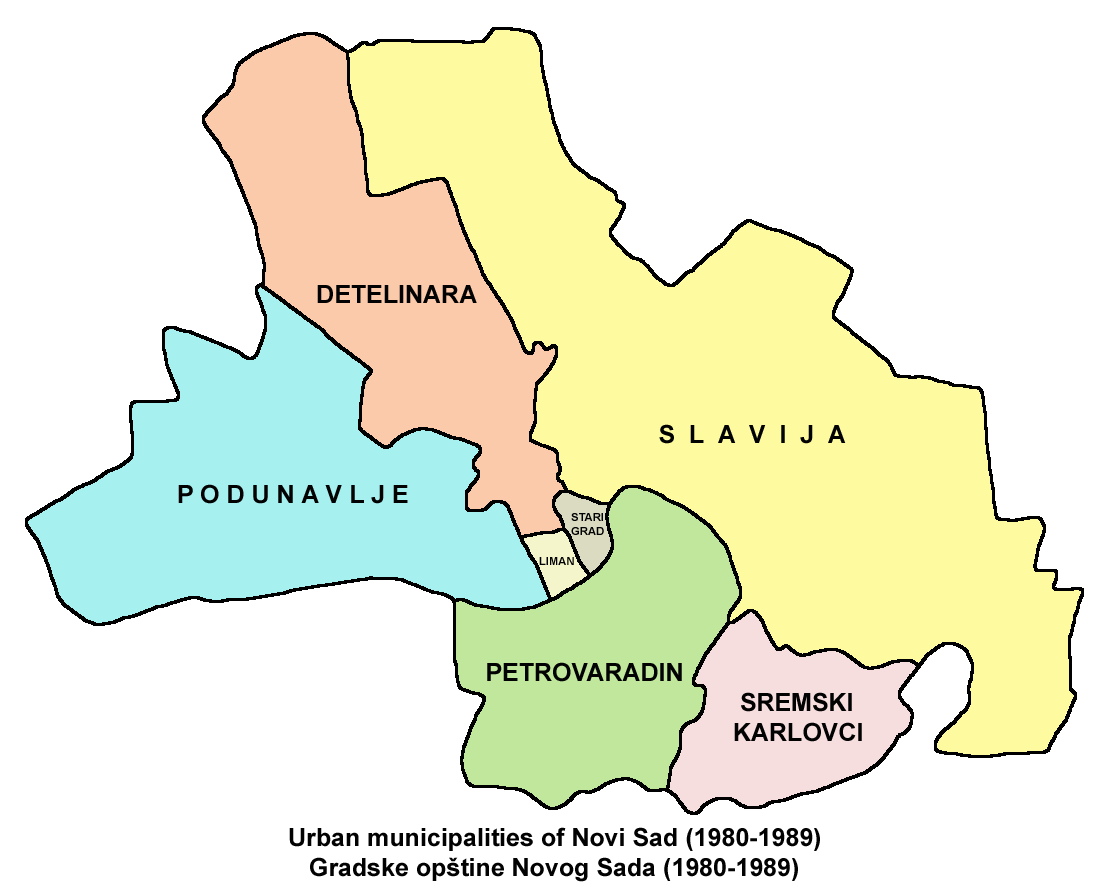
Former urban municipalities of Novi Sad, 1980-1989

Slavija (Serbian Cyrillic: Славија) was one of the seven municipalities composing the city of Novi Sad between 1980 and 1989. The municipality included part of the city quarter of Rotkvarija, city quarters of Salajka, Pervazovo Naselje, Podbara, Vidovdansko Naselje, Slana Bara, Klisa, Mali Beograd, Veliki Rit, Šangaj, Radna Zona Sever 4 and Deponija, as well as the villages of Kać, Budisava, Kovilj and Čenej.
