= Politics of Novi Sad =

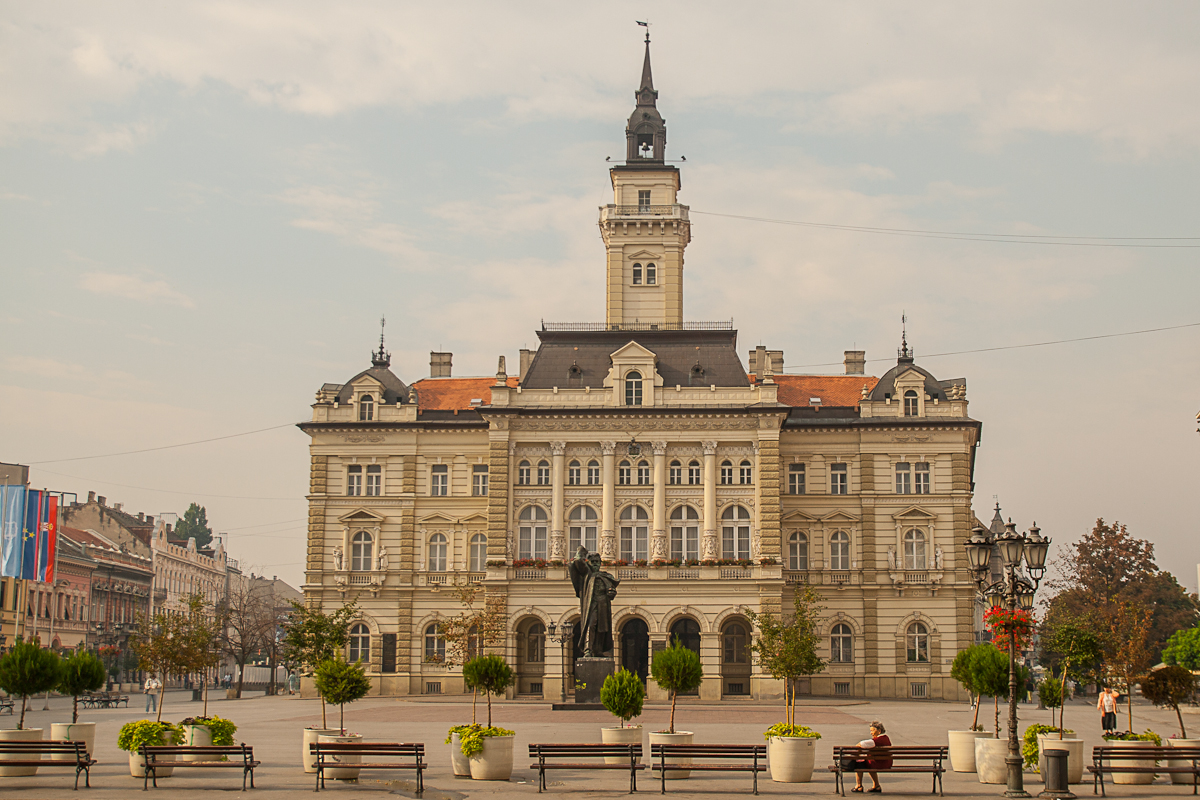
The City Hall - Office of the mayor. Built in 1894 according to the project of architect Molnár György.

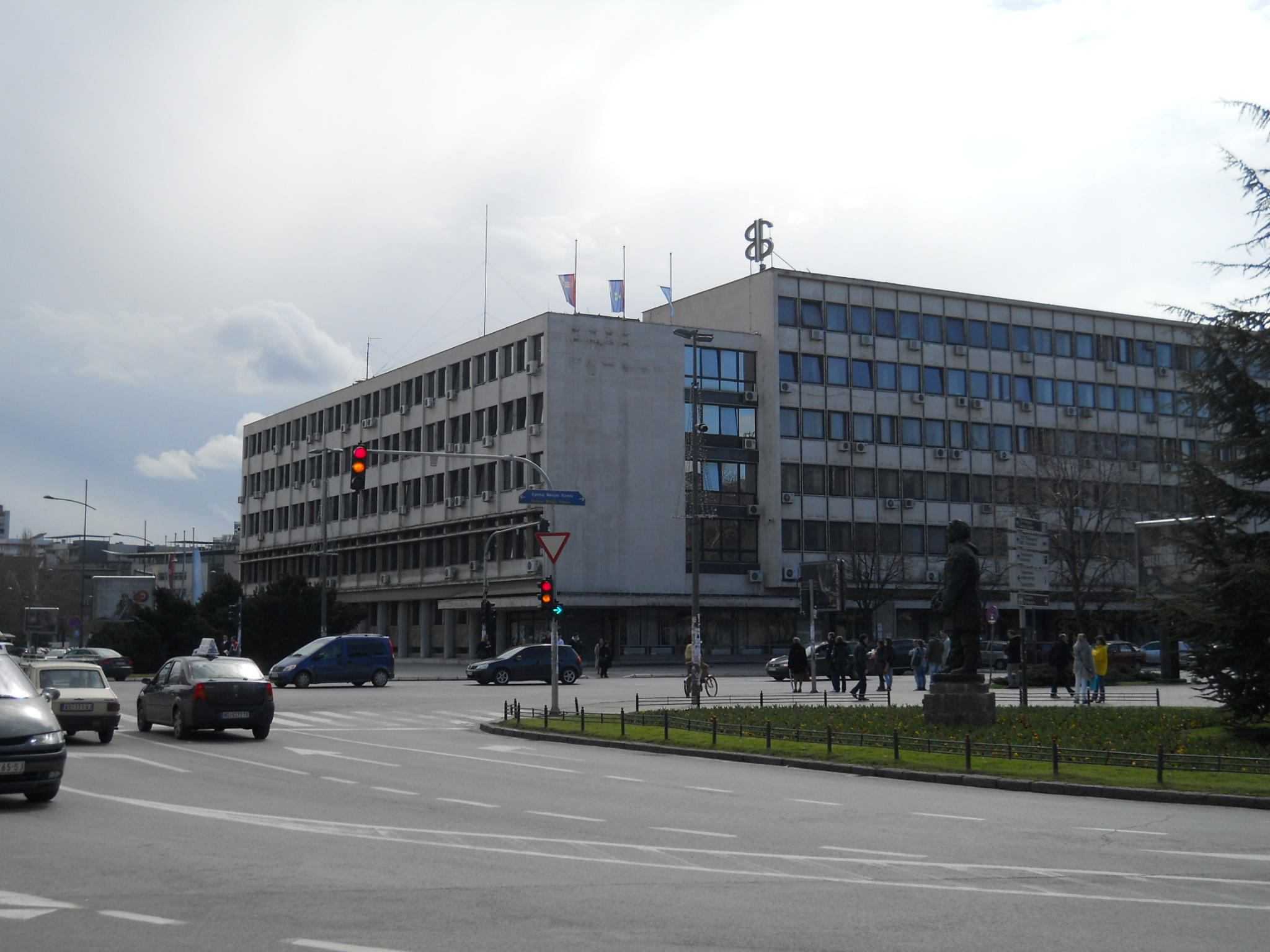
Building of the City Assembly of Novi Sad. Built in 1960 according to the project of architect Sibin Djorđević.

Novi Sad is the capital of the Serbian province of Vojvodina and the second largest city in Serbia.

== Political history ==
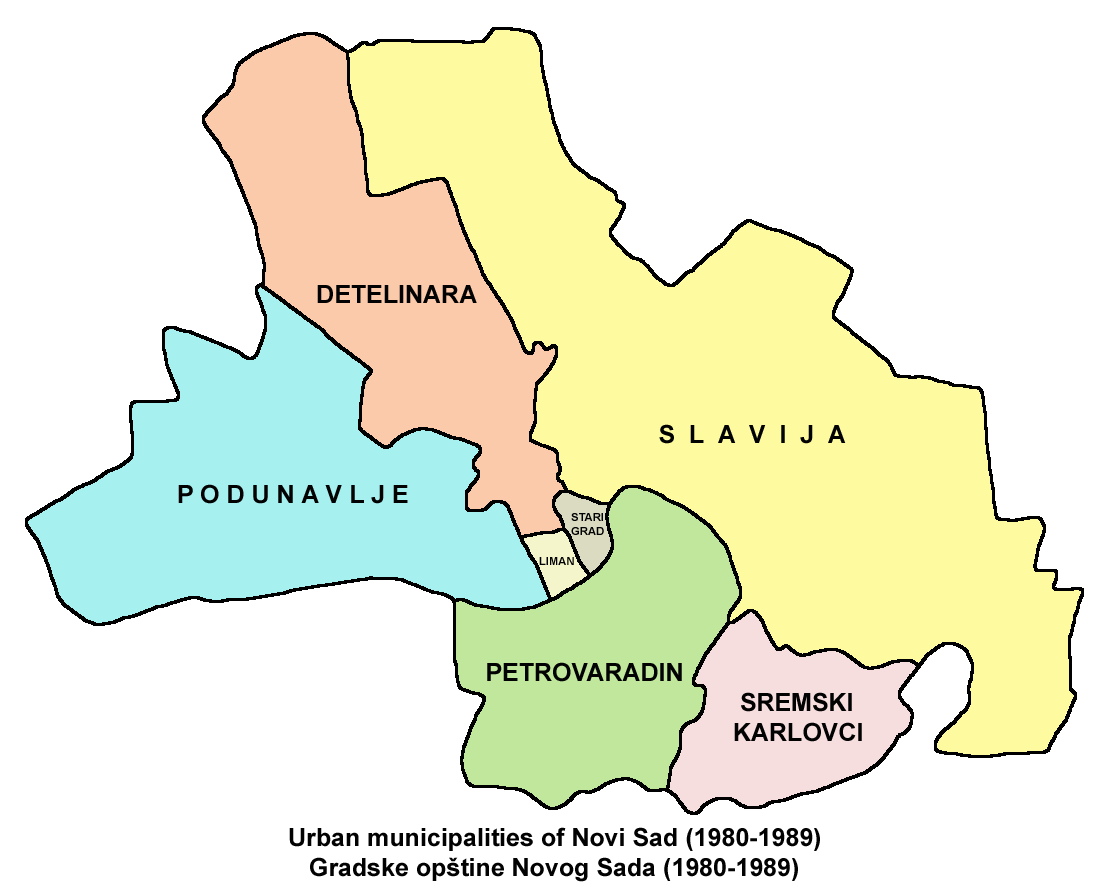
Urban municipalities of Novi Sad, 1980-1989.

The city was founded in 1694 and its first names were Ratzen Stadt (Serbian: Racka Varoš) and Peterwardein Schantz (Serbian: Petrovaradinski Šanac). Since 1702, it was part of the Habsburg Military Frontier. In 1746–1748, when one part of the Military Frontier was abolished, city was placed under civil administration and obtained royal free city status. The edict of empress Maria Theresa of Austria that made Novi Sad a royal free city was proclaimed on February 1, 1748. That was also a time when the current name of the city was introduced. In various languages it was written as: Neoplantae (Latin), Neusatz (German), Újvidék (Hungarian), and Novi Sad (Serbian).

During the 1880s, Hungarians took over local city administration from the Serbs, and their representatives dominated the city government until 1918. After 1918, the city government was again dominated by the Serbs. Although it was a cultural and political center of Vojvodinian Serbs (and Serbs in general) in the 19th century, Novi Sad was not the administrative center of any larger administrative unit during most of the period of the Habsburg administration. Briefly, it was a district center in the Voivodeship of Serbia and Banat of Temeschwar province that existed from 1849 to 1860. Administrative significance of the city highly increased in 1918, when it became part of the Kingdom of Serbs, Croats and Slovenes. In 1918–1919, Novi Sad was capital of Banat, Bačka and Baranja region, and also administrative center of Novi Sad County (from 1918 to 1922). From 1922 to 1929 it was administrative center of Bačka Oblast, and from 1929 to 1941 administrative center of Danube Banovina.

From 1941 to 1944, city was under Axis occupation, and the occupational authorities degraded the status of Novi Sad to an administratively unimportant town located on the border between Horthy's Hungary and Pavelić's Independent State of Croatia. After the war, administrative significance of Novi Sad increased again and it became the capital of the Autonomous Province of Vojvodina within People's Republic of Serbia and new socialist Yugoslavia.

From 1980 to 1989, city was divided into seven urban municipalities: Stari Grad, Podunavlje, Liman, Slavija, Petrovaradin, Detelinara and Sremski Karlovci. In 1989, six of those municipalities were merged into single Municipality of Novi Sad, while municipality of Sremski Karlovci was transformed into separate administrative unit, which is completely independent from Novi Sad. Since 2002, when the new statute of Novi Sad came into effect, City of Novi Sad is divided into 46 local communities. The city has its parliament, a governing mayor, and a city council.

== Administration bodies ==
=== Mayor ===
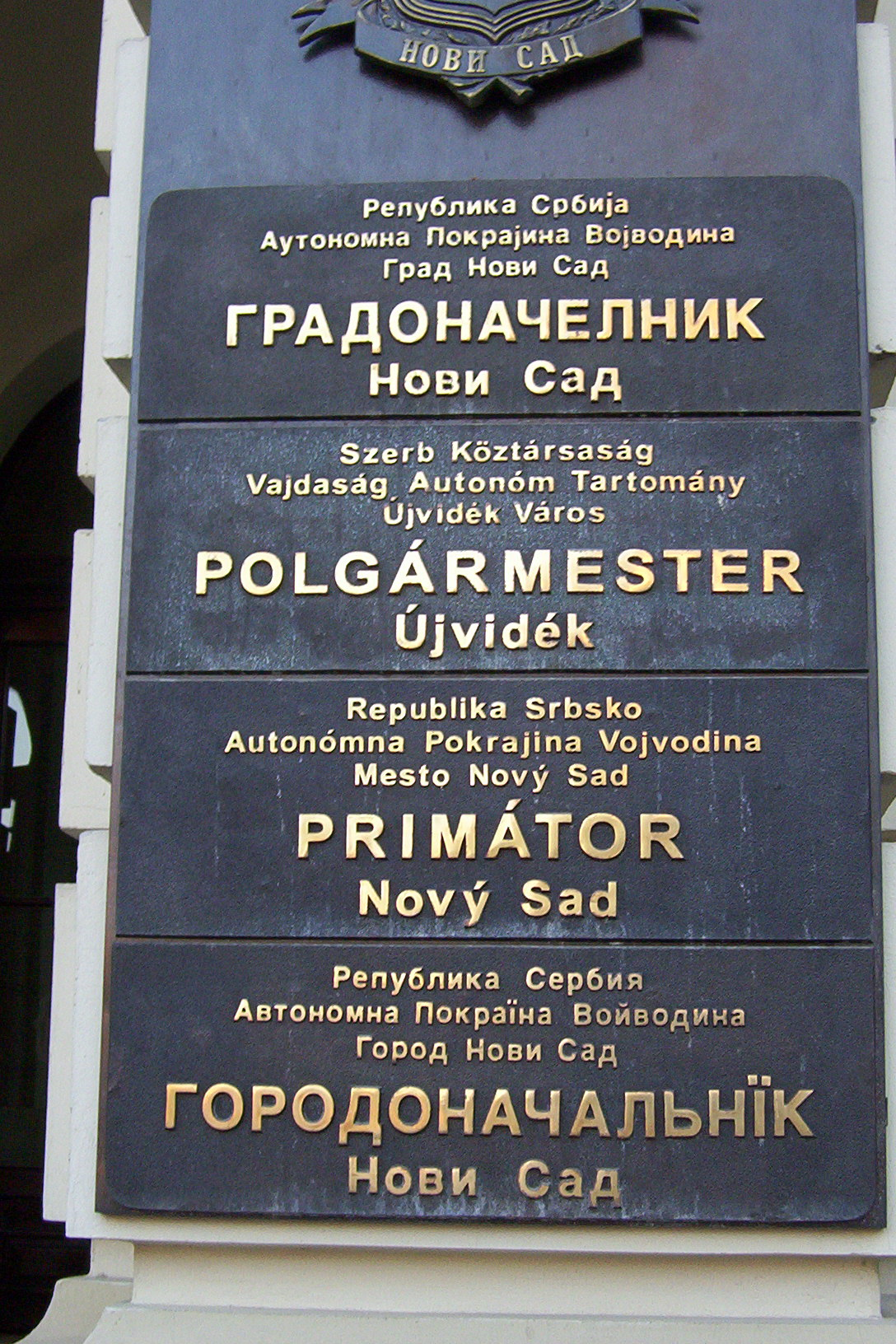
Mayor office written in four official languages used in the City of Novi Sad (Serbian, Hungarian, Slovak, and Rusyn)

The executive branch is headed by the Mayor of Novi Sad City, who is elected by direct popular vote. The mayor serves a term of four years and is limited to two terms in office. Until 2004, all mayors and municipality presidents in Serbia were elected by the city's and municipality parliaments. After changes in the law, in 2004 elections, all mayors and municipality presidents (except for urban municipalities) were elected by direct popular vote.

The City's second mayor elected by direct popular vote in September 2004 was Maja Gojković, who is also the only female yet to be the major political figure of Novi Sad. Afterwards the electoral system was reversed, so city currently has no mayor in classical meaning of the word, but President of the Executive council of the assembly, which is currently Žarko Mićin from Serbian Progressive Party.

=== City Assembly ===
Party	Seats
SNS Coalition	45
United for a Free Novi Sad	21
I'm Novi Sad Too–Go-Change	8
Heroes	3
Alliance of Vojvodina Hungarians	1

The Assembly of the City of Novi Sad is the lawmaking body of the City. It comprises 78 members from 46 local communities throughout the two municipalities. The Assembly monitors performance of city agencies and makes land use decisions as well as legislating on a variety of other issues. The Assembly also has sole responsibility for approving the city budget. The Council has seventeen committees with oversight of various functions of the city government. City has also committee for improving and protection of the city's national minorities.

Assembly members are elected every four years. In 2024 local elections, SNS Coalition won most seats in the City parliament, and formed a coalition with Socialist Party of Serbia, Party of United Pensioners, Farmers, and Proletarians of Serbia – Solidarity and Justice, Serbian Radical Party, Movement of Socialists, Serbian People's Party, Serbian Party Oathkeepers, Independent Serbian Party and the Alliance of Vojvodina Hungarians. Current president of the city assembly is Jelena Marinković Radomirović.

=== City Council ===
Council is a body that coordinates between City's parliament and Mayor and manage the City. It has 11 members who are elected by the mayor and confirmed by the parliament. Chairman of the council is the mayor. Council has also a responsibility for conferred City's budget and helps the mayor with governing.

== Administrative subdivisions ==
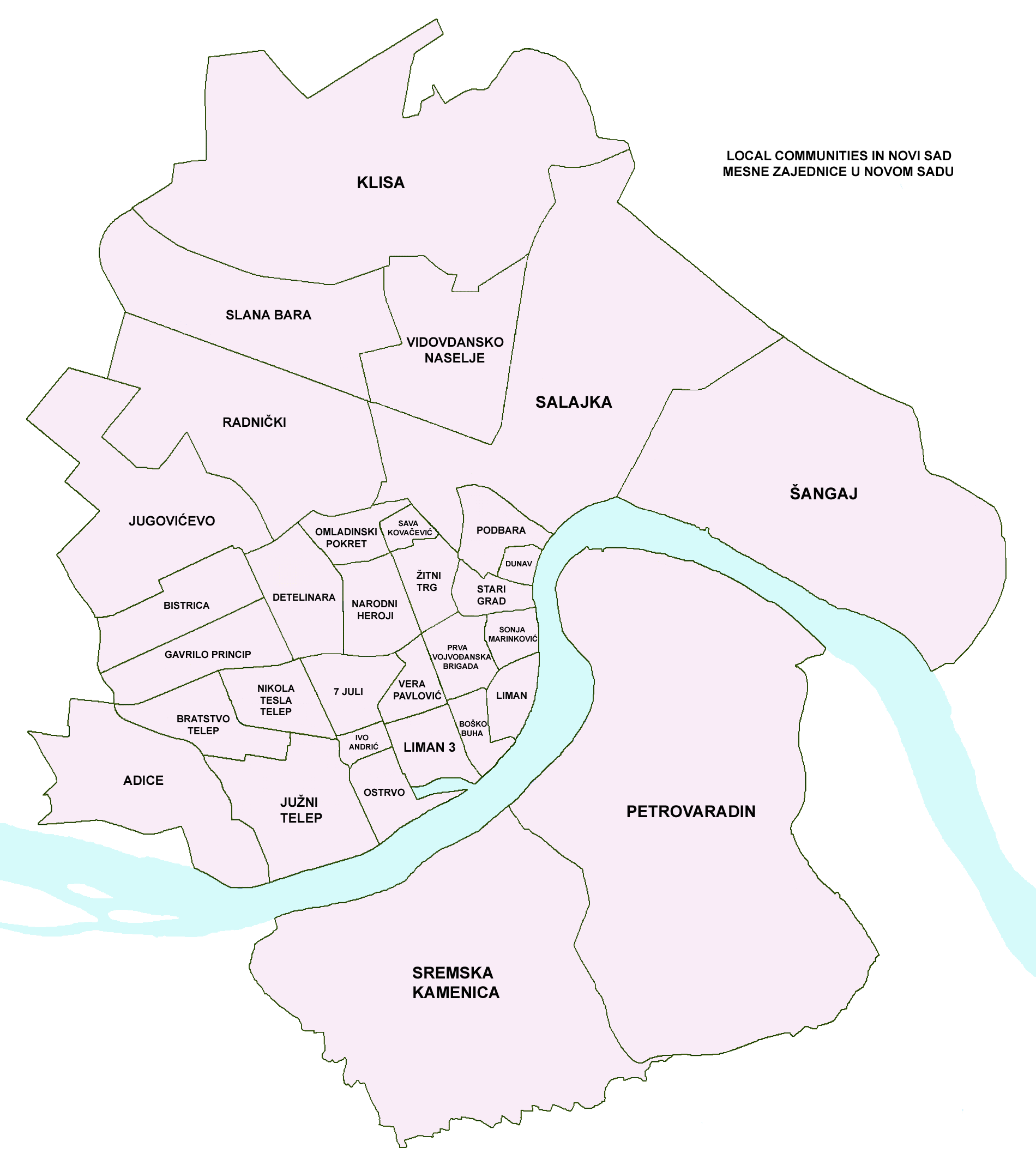
Map of local communities in urban part of Novi Sad

Novi Sad is divided into local communities (Serbian: Mesne zajednice / Месне заједнице). There are 47 local communities in the city.

Every local community has its own council, which comprises one or two MPs in the city's parliament and community president. The president is elected by majority of residents on local meetings. Local community has meetings (couple of times in one month). At local meetings are present members of the council as well as local residents. Meetings are good for discussing local maters, like constructions of new buildings, new roads, complaints of the local residents, and to address their local city's MPs, who can pass their complaints on to the city's officials.

== City holidays ==
February 1	On this day, in 1748, Novi Sad gained "free royal city" status.
October 23	The partisan forces from Srem and Bačka entered and liberated the city from occupation on this day, in 1944.
November 9	Troops of the Kingdom of Serbia entered the city on this day, in 1918, led by commandant Petar Bojović.
November 25	In 1918, the Assembly of Serbs, Bunjevci, and other Slavs of Vojvodina (Banat, Bačka and Baranja) in Novi Sad proclaimed the unification of Vojvodina region with the Kingdom of Serbia.

City also commemorates the year 1694, when it was established.

== Twin towns – sister cities ==
Novi Sad is twinned with:

- Alexandria, Egypt (2021)
- Budva, Montenegro (1996)
- Changchun, China (1981)
- Cleveland, Ohio, United States (2023)
- Dortmund, Germany (1982)
- Gomel, Belarus (2013)
- Ilioupoli, Greece (1994)
- Istočno Sarajevo, Bosnia and Herzegovina (2021)
- Kumanovo, North Macedonia (2019)
- Modena, Italy (1964)
- Nizhny Novgorod, Russia (2006)
- Norwich, England, United Kingdom (1989)
- Pécs, Hungary (2009)
- Taverny, France (2020)
- Timișoara, Romania (2005)
- Tivat, Montenegro (2023)
- Toluca, Mexico (2015)

=== Cooperation agreements ===
Novi Sad cooperates with:

- Banja Luka, Bosnia and Herzegovina (2006)
- Corfu, Greece (2017)
- Enghien-les-Bains, France (2020)
- Frunzensky District, Russia (2003)
- Gothenburg, Sweden (2002)
- Kranj, Slovenia (2004)
- Krasnodar, Russia
- Lviv, Ukraine (1999)
- Nant, France (2002)
- Osijek, Croatia (2002)
- Oryol, Russia (2017)
- Saint-Leu-la-Forêt, France (2020)
- Shiraz, Iran (2023)
- Szeged, Hungary (2001)
- Tivat, Montenegro (2023)
- Tuzla, Bosnia and Herzegovina (2002)
- Ulm, Germany (2000)

== See also ==
- List of honorary citizens of Novi Sad
