= Veliki Rit, Novi Sad =

Coordinates: 45°18′16″N 19°50′00″E

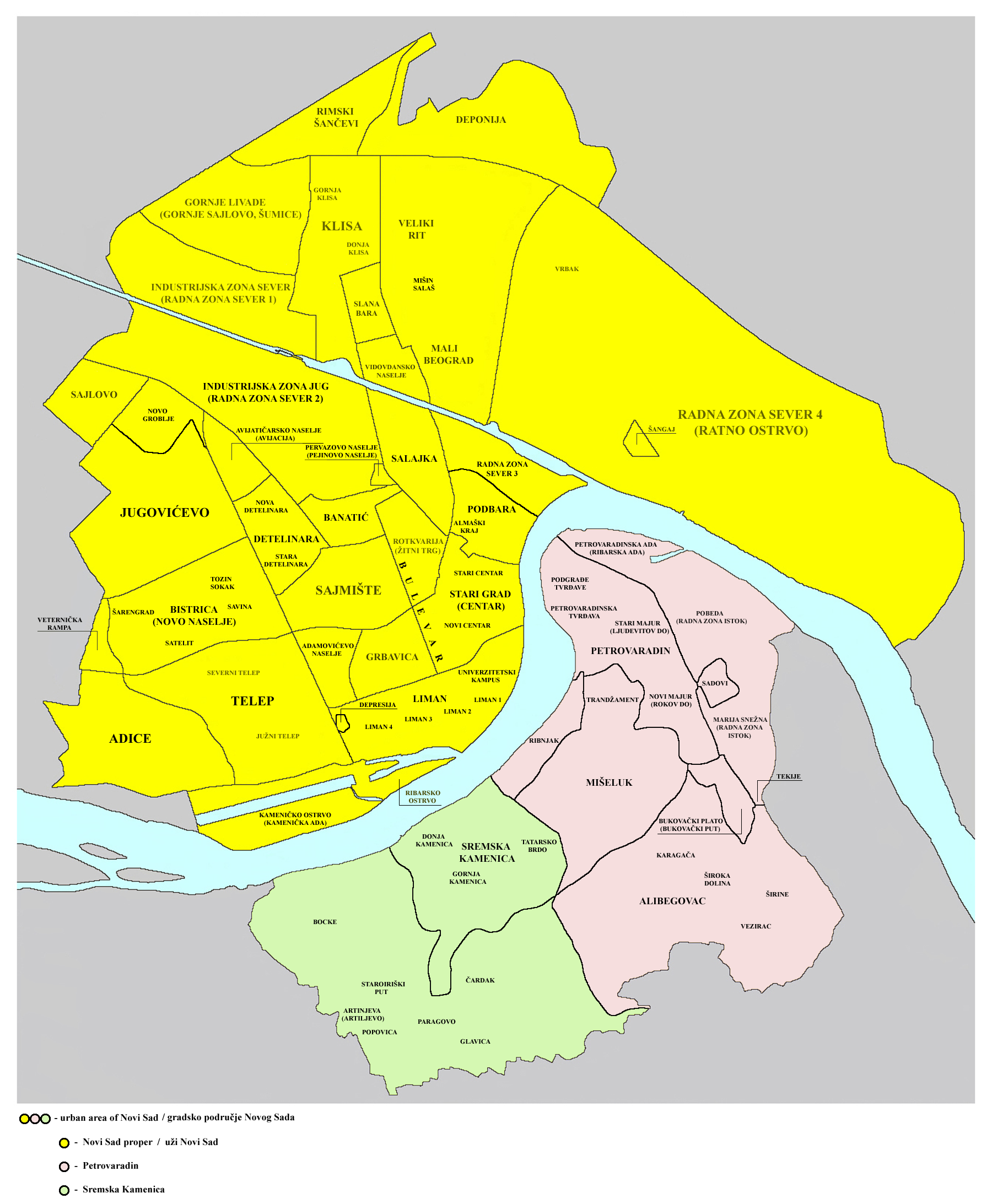
Map of the urban area of Novi Sad with city quarters, showing the location of Veliki Rit

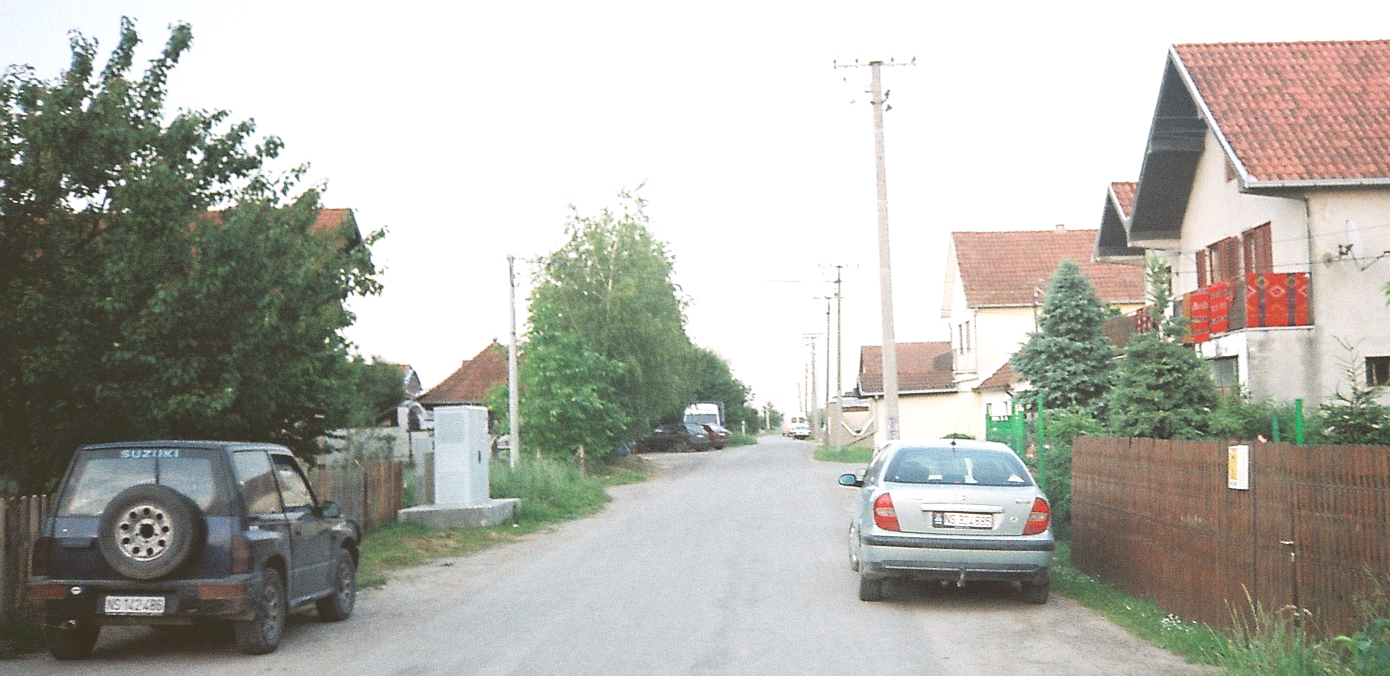
Street in Veliki Rit

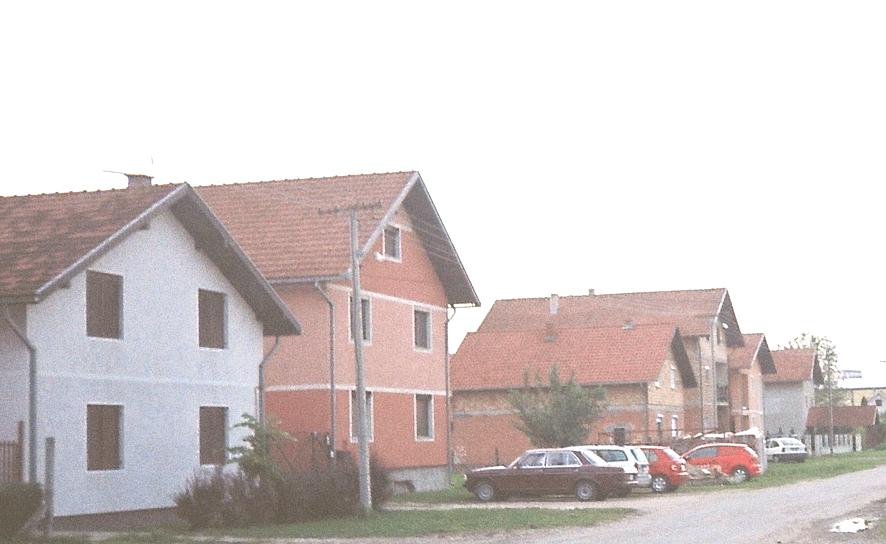
Street in Veliki Rit

Veliki Rit (Serbian Cyrillic: Велики Рит) is an urban neighborhood of the city of Novi Sad, Serbia.

== Name ==
Name "veliki rit" means "big marsh" in Serbian.

== Location ==
Veliki Rit is located in the northern part of Novi Sad between Klisa and Slana Bara in the west, Mišin Salaš and Mali Beograd in the south, Deponija in the north, and Radna Zona Sever 4 in the east.

== Population ==
Veliki Rit is the largest ethnic Romani neighborhood in Novi Sad. Its population numbering 2,500 inhabitants, of whom 70-90% are refugees from Kosovo and south Serbia. According to another source, population of Veliki Rit include 350 Romani families, of whom 150 are refugees from Kosovo. There are some 30 Ashkali families in the settlement as well.

== Organizations ==
The Society of Roma Veliki Rit is an ethnic Roma organization located in the neighborhood, whose purpose is to cooperate with other Roma societies and to improve economical status of Roma people in the neighborhood.

== See also ==
- Neighborhoods of Novi Sad
- List of Roma settlements
