= Slana Bara =

Slana Bara Слана Бара
- Urban neighborhood
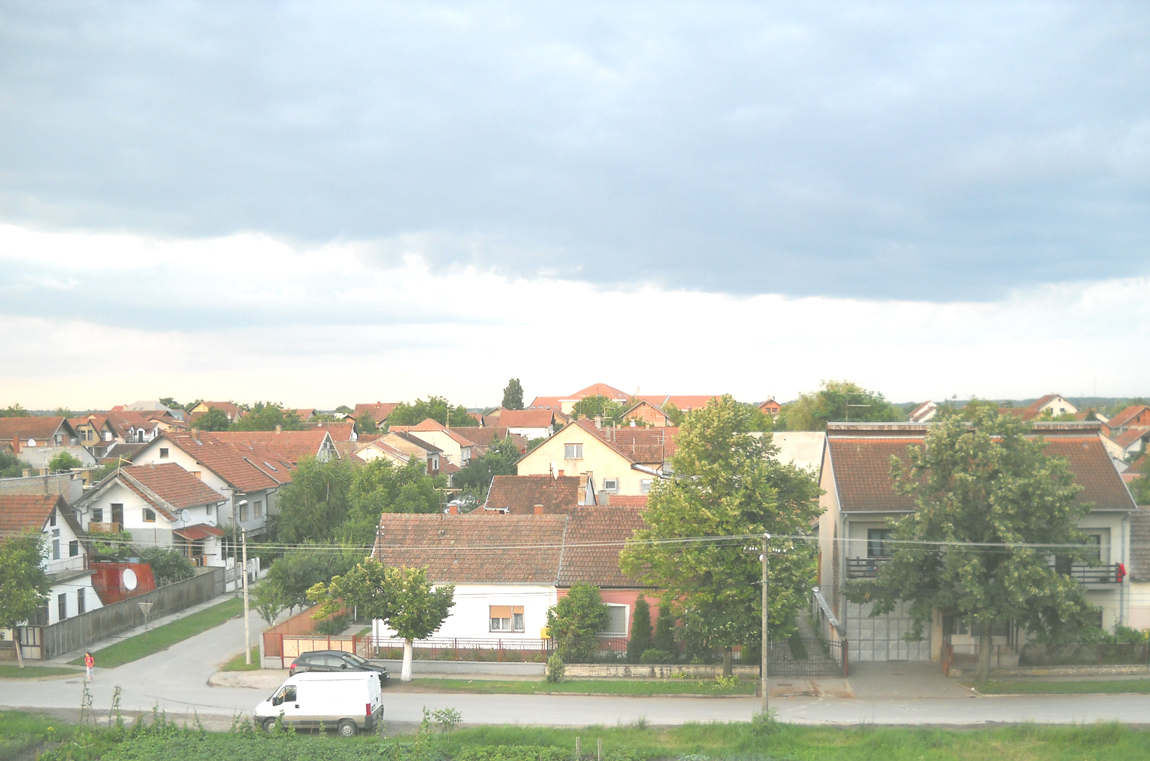
- View of Slana Bara
- Interactive map of Slana Bara
- Country: Serbia
- Province: Vojvodina
- District: South Bačka
- Municipality: Novi Sad

Area
  - Total: 4.57 km^{2} (1.76 sq mi)
- Time zone: UTC+1 (CET)
  - Summer (DST): UTC+2 (CEST)
- Area code: +381(0)21
- Car plates: NS

Slana Bara (Serbian: Слана Бара) is an urban neighborhood of the city of Novi Sad, Serbia.

== Name ==
Its name in the Serbian language means "the salty bog". The name refer to the large bog that existed in this area in the past, and whose remains are still visible.

== History ==
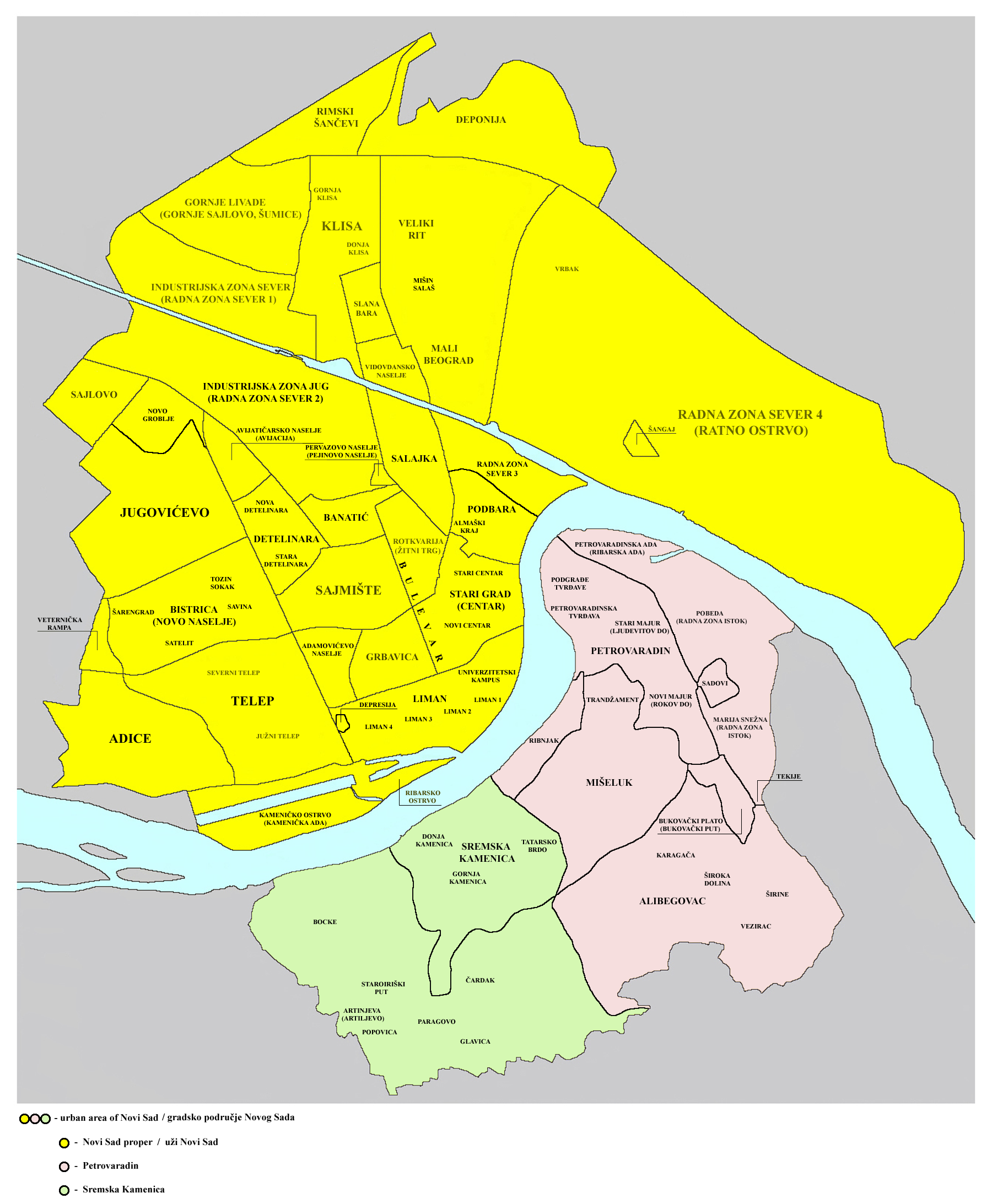
Map of the urban area of Novi Sad with city quarters, showing the location of Slana Bara

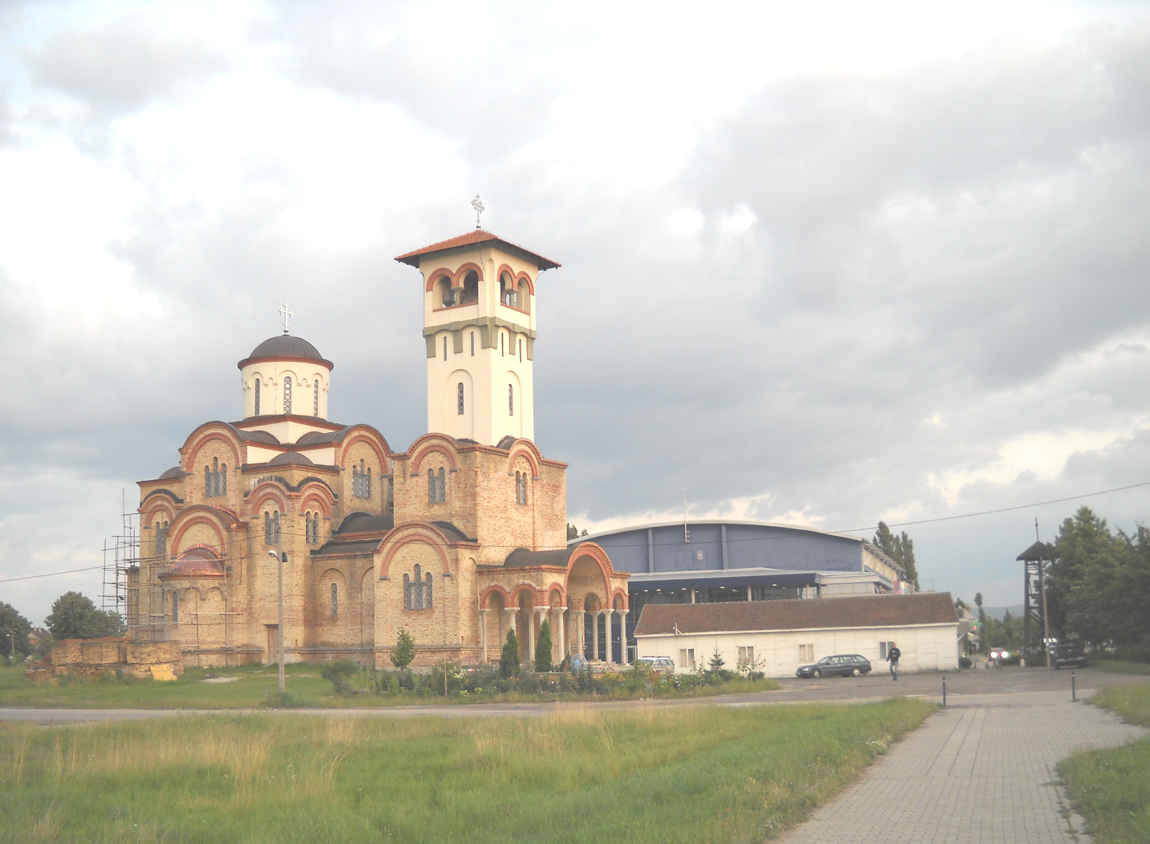
View of Slana Bara - older wooden Orthodox church, new Orthodox church and Sports center

A large Slavic village named Bivalo (Bivaljoš) existed at this location in the past. Name of the village came from the Slavic word "bivalo" meaning "buffalo" in English. The village is mentioned first in 1237, but archeological research showed that it dates from the 5th-6th century.

In the 16th century, the village was destroyed and later Ottoman defters mention Bivaljoš as heath that was inhabited by people, but not in the form of the settlement. In 1554, the Ottoman defter recorded that Bivaljoš have one house that paid taxes. In 1570, there were no recorded houses that paid taxes in Bivaljoš. However, since Ottoman defters did not recorded houses that were liberated from paying taxes, these records do not show correct number of inhabitants of the area. Bivaljoš was last time mentioned in 1701 as heath that was used for cattle pasture.

New settlement in the territory of present-day Slana Bara was founded in the last decade of the 19th century by the Romanian-speaking ethnic Romani. This settlement had about 1,000 inhabitants. In the beginning of the 20th century, Serbs and others also started to settle in the area. In 1921, the Novi Sad city authorities adopted the decision to give house lots on Slana Bara to poor families for house construction. The important event for the further development of the settlement was the construction of the international road in 1936–38.

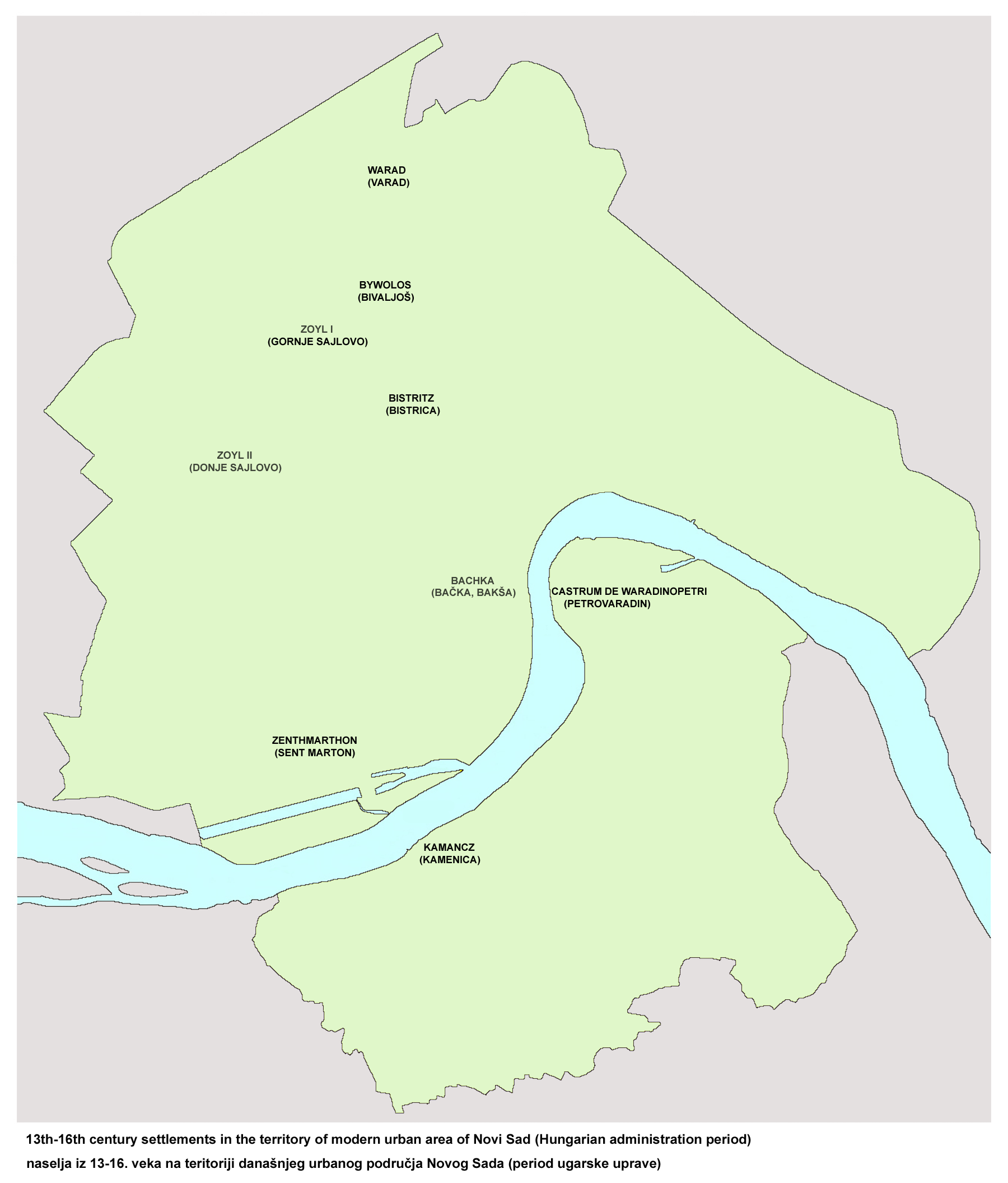
Medieval settlement of Bivaljoš in the location of modern Slana Bara (13-16th century)

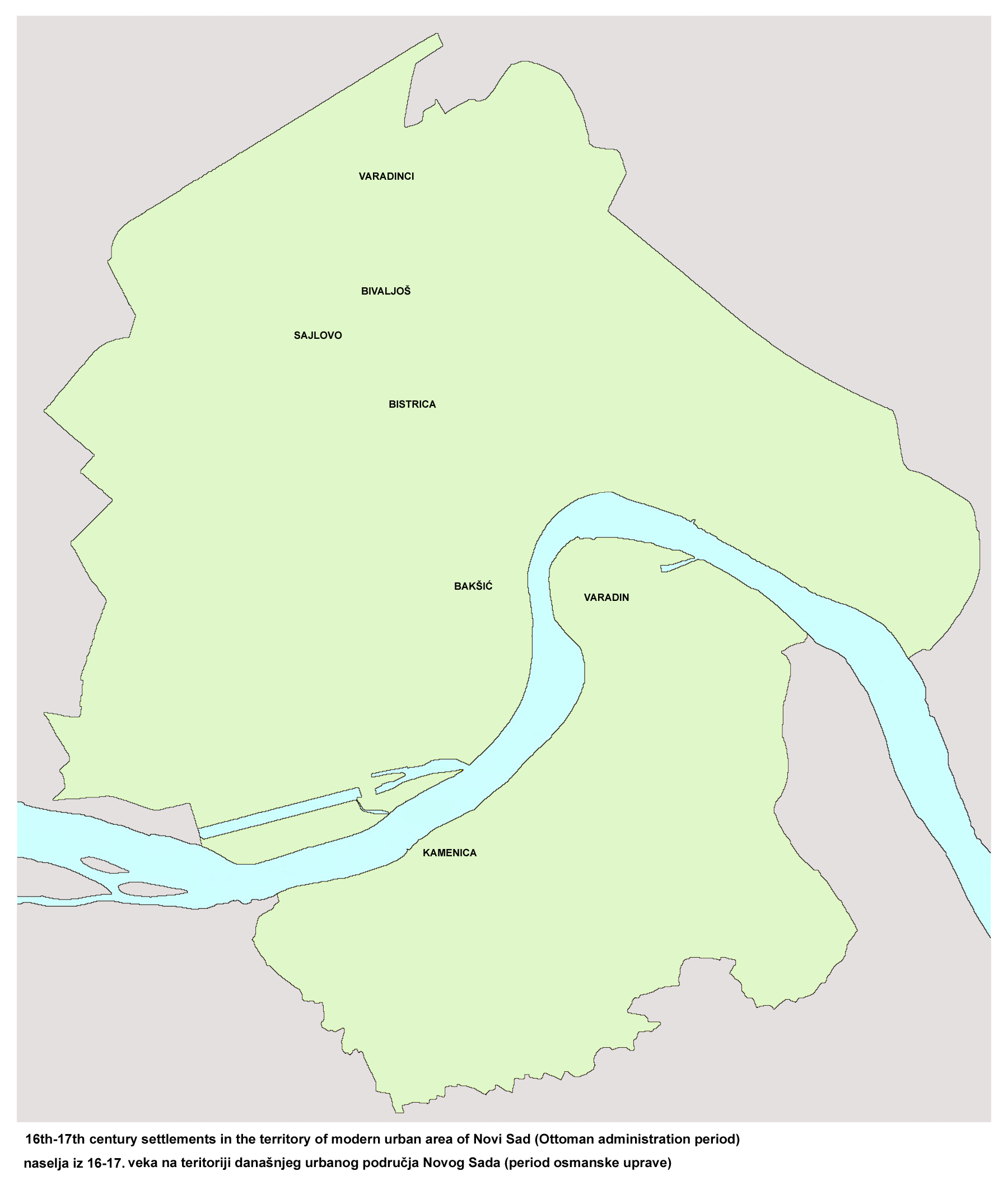
Settlement of Bivaljoš in the location of modern Slana Bara during Ottoman administration (16th-17th century)

== Borders ==
The southern border of Slana Bara is Primorska ulica (Primorska Street), the eastern border is Temerinski put (Temerin Road), the northern border is Zelengorska ulica (Zelengorska Street), and the western border is Sentandrejski put (Sentandreja Road).

== Neighbouring city quarters ==
The neighbouring city quarters are: Mali Beograd and Veliki Rit in the east, Klisa in the north and west, and Vidovdansko Naselje in the south.

== Gallery ==
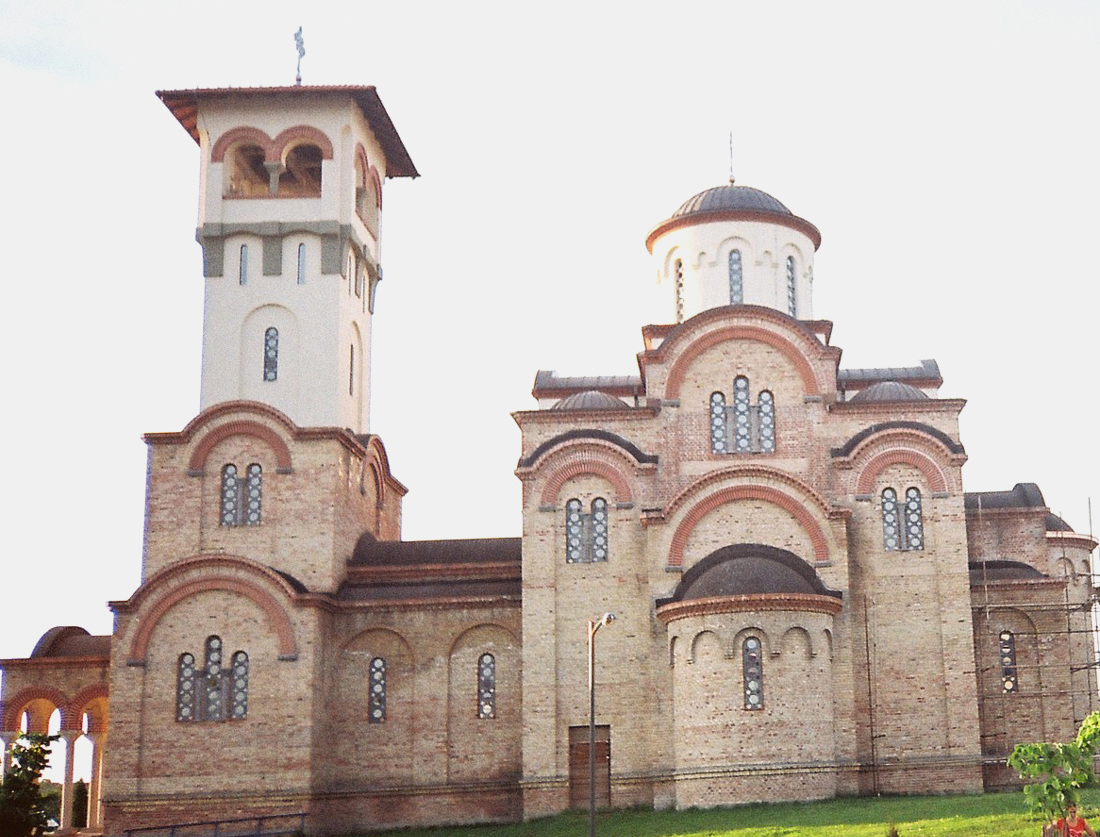
New Orthodox church in Slana Bara

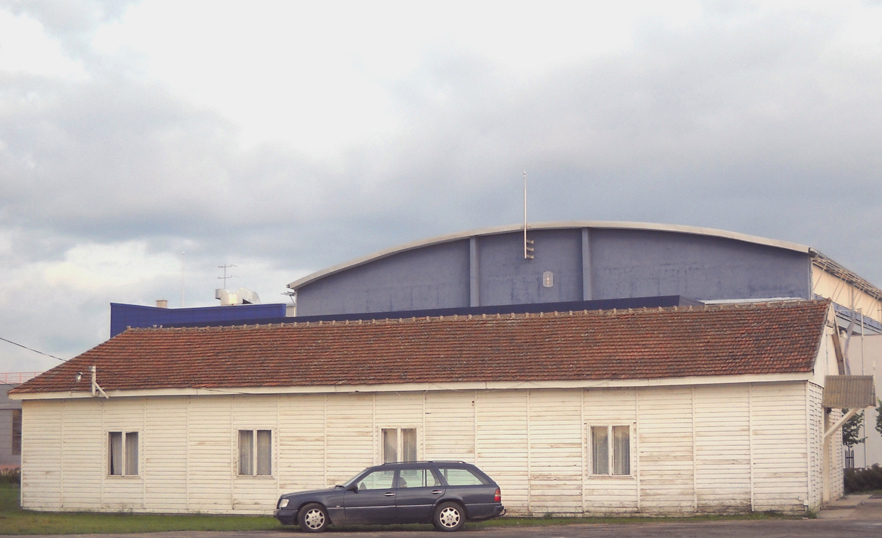
Older wooden Orthodox church in Slana Bara

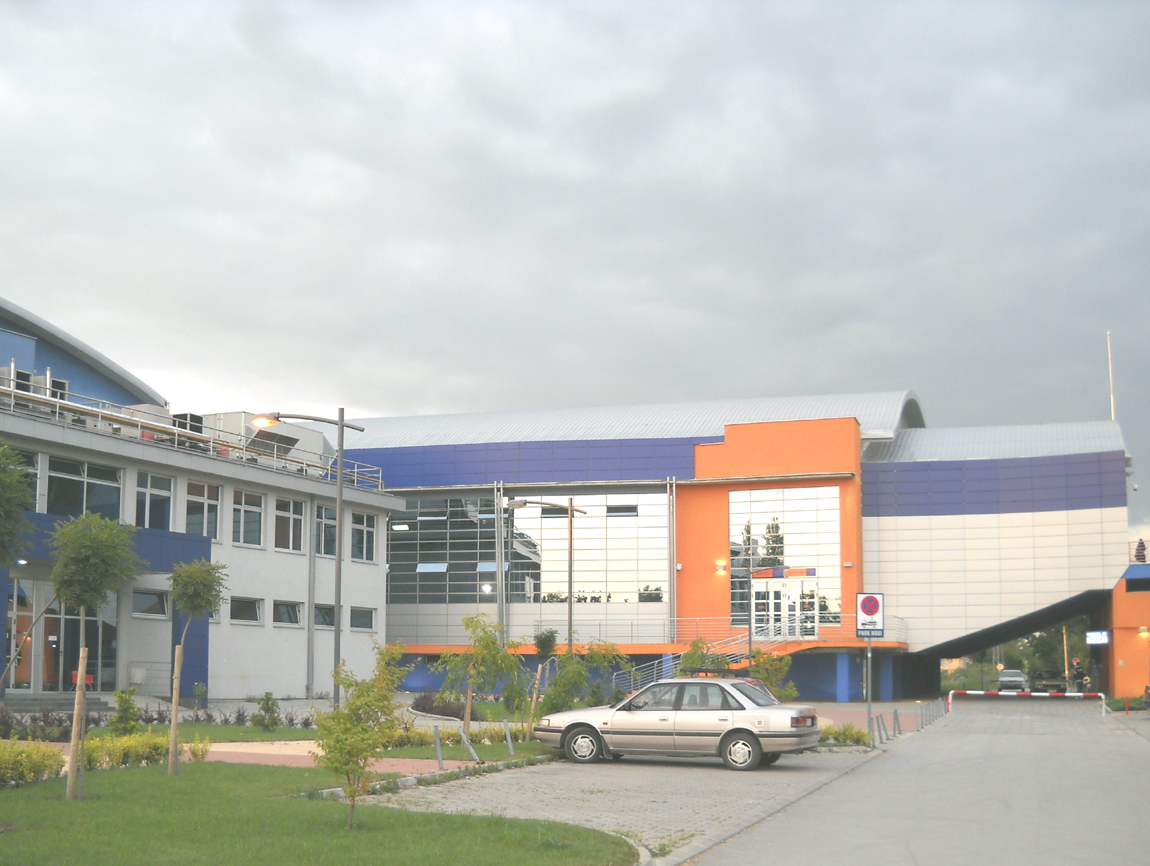
Sports center in Slana Bara

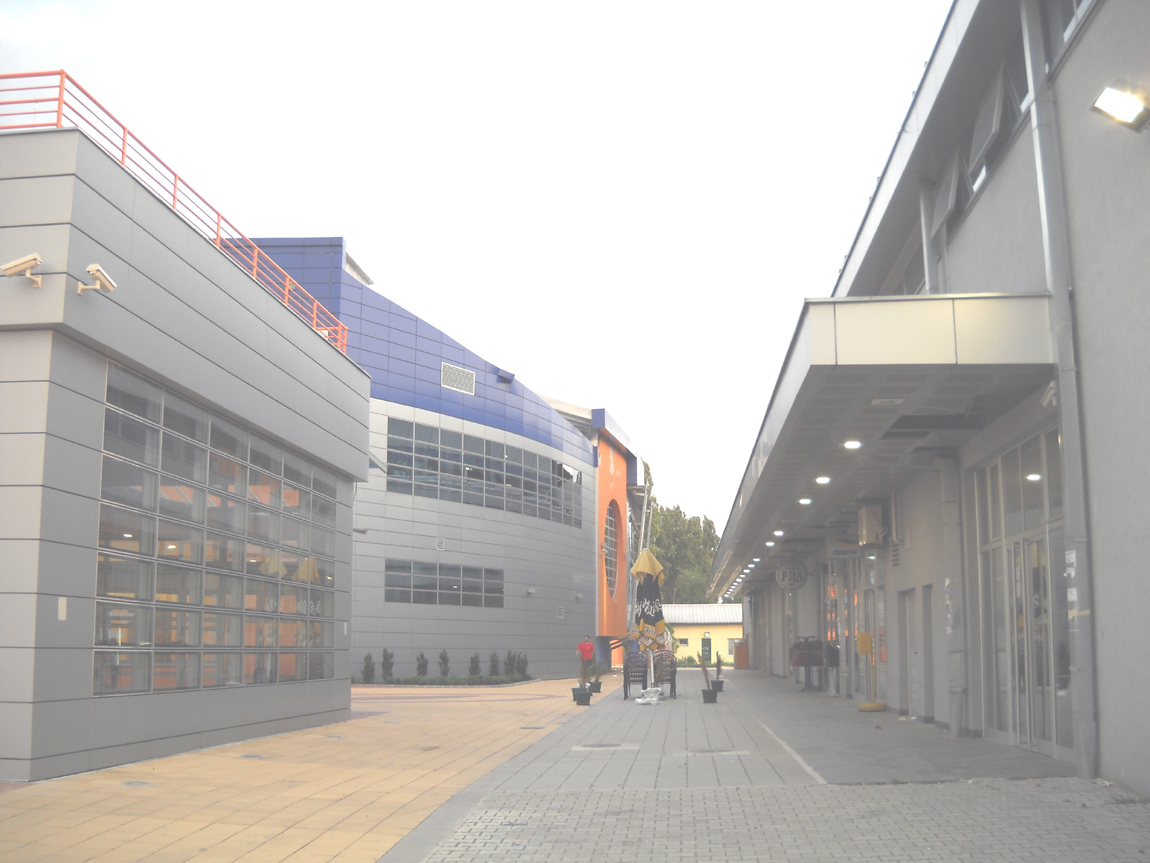
Sports center in Slana Bara

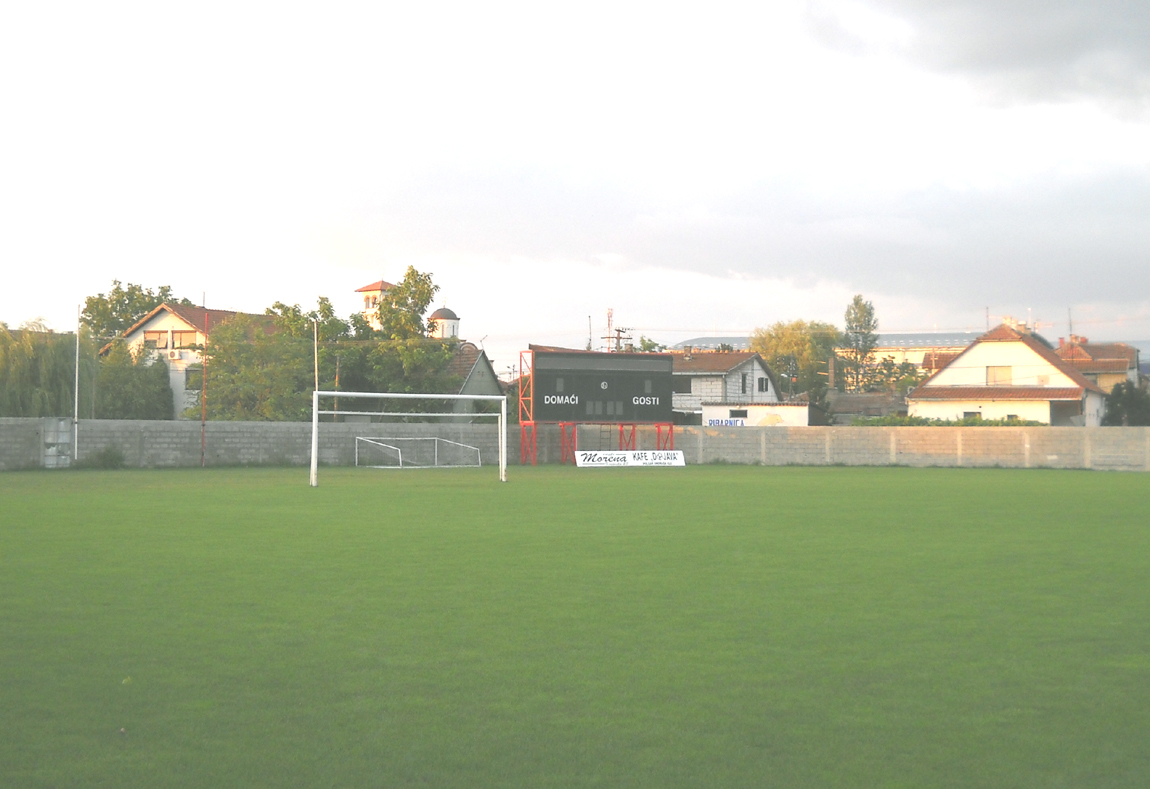
FK Proleter football stadium in western part of Slana Bara (southern part of Klisa)

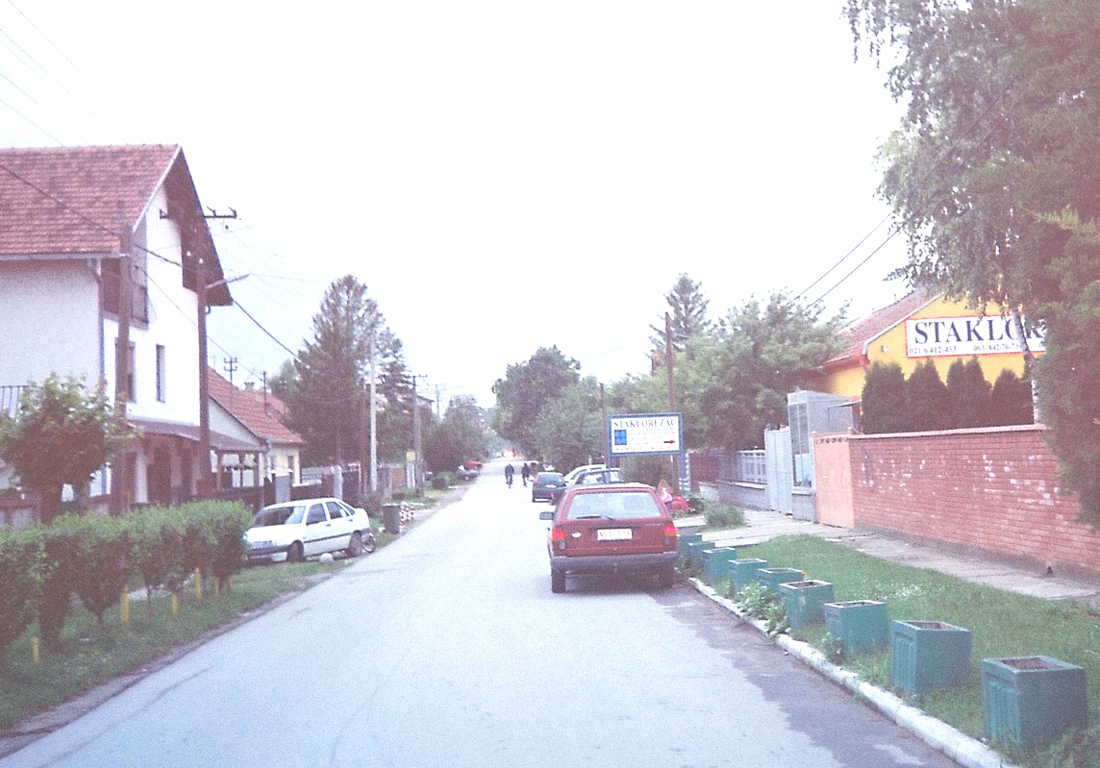
Street in Slana Bara

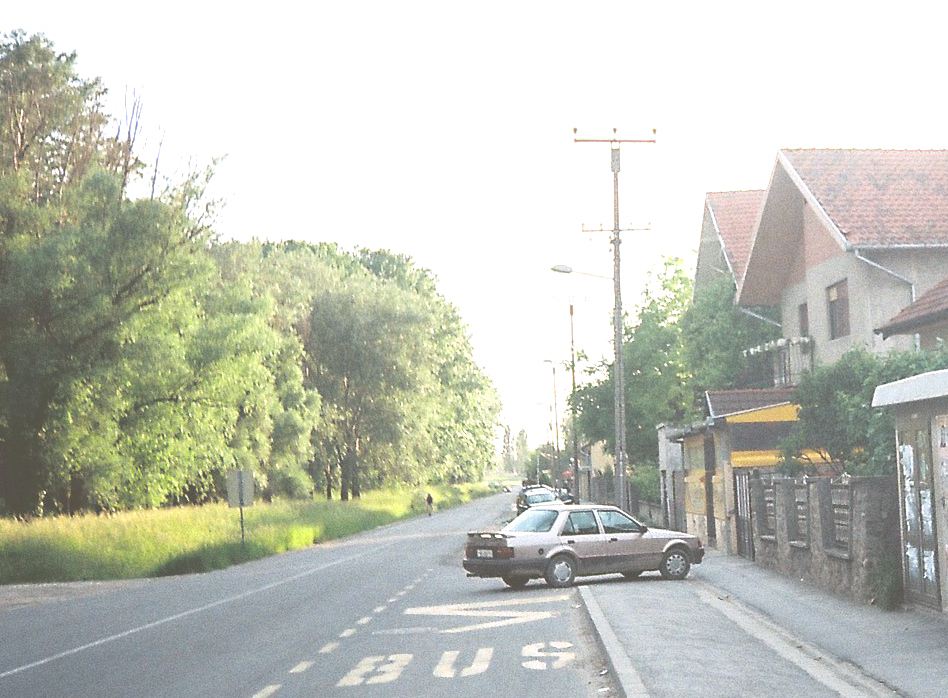
Street in western part of Slana Bara (southern part of Klisa)

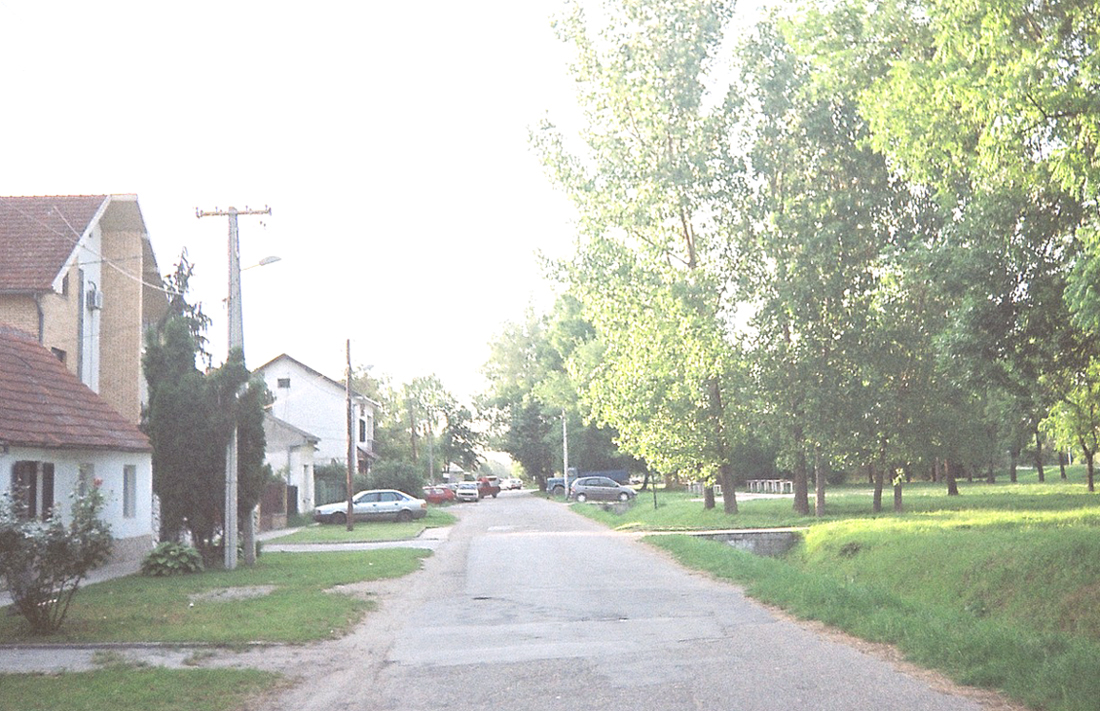
Street in western part of Slana Bara (southern part of Klisa)

== See also ==
- Neighborhoods of Novi Sad
