= Klisa, Serbia =

Klisa Клиса
- Urban neighborhood
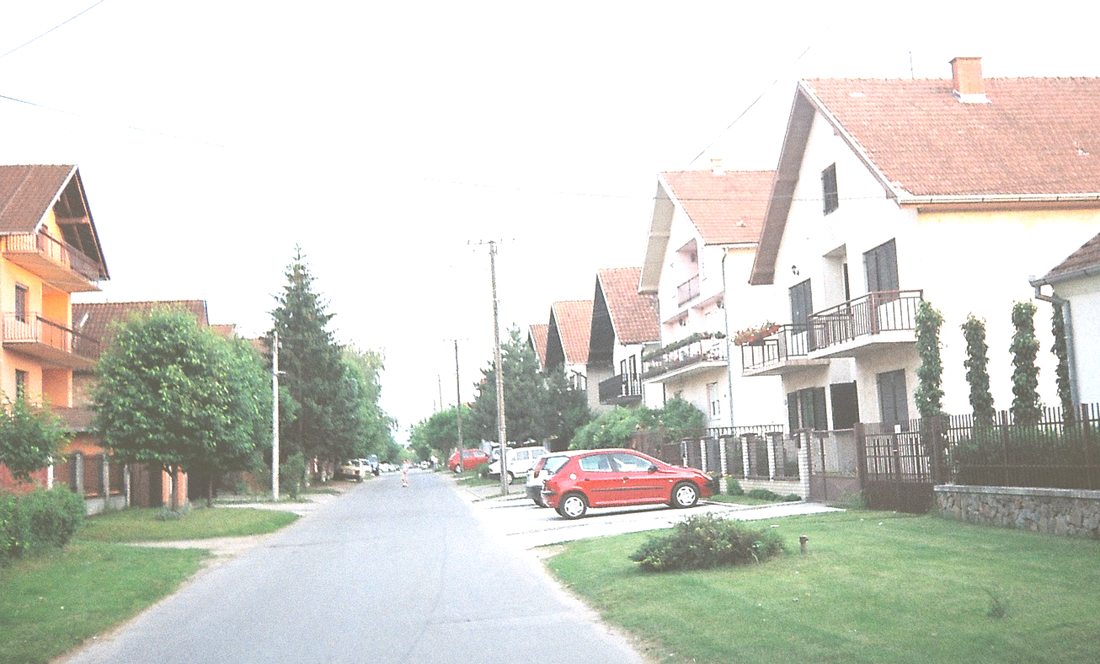
- Street in Klisa
- Interactive map of Klisa
- Country: Serbia
- Province: Vojvodina
- District: South Bačka
- Municipality: Novi Sad

Area
  - Total: 13.34 km^{2} (5.15 sq mi)
- Time zone: UTC+1 (CET)
  - Summer (DST): UTC+2 (CEST)
- Area code: +381(0)21
- Car plates: NS

Klisa (Serbian: Клиса) is an urban area of the city of Novi Sad, Serbia.

== Name ==
Its name derived from Latin word "ecclesia", meaning "church place". During Ottoman rule, the Serb population used word "klisa" to designate places where ruins of the church buildings were located.

== Location ==
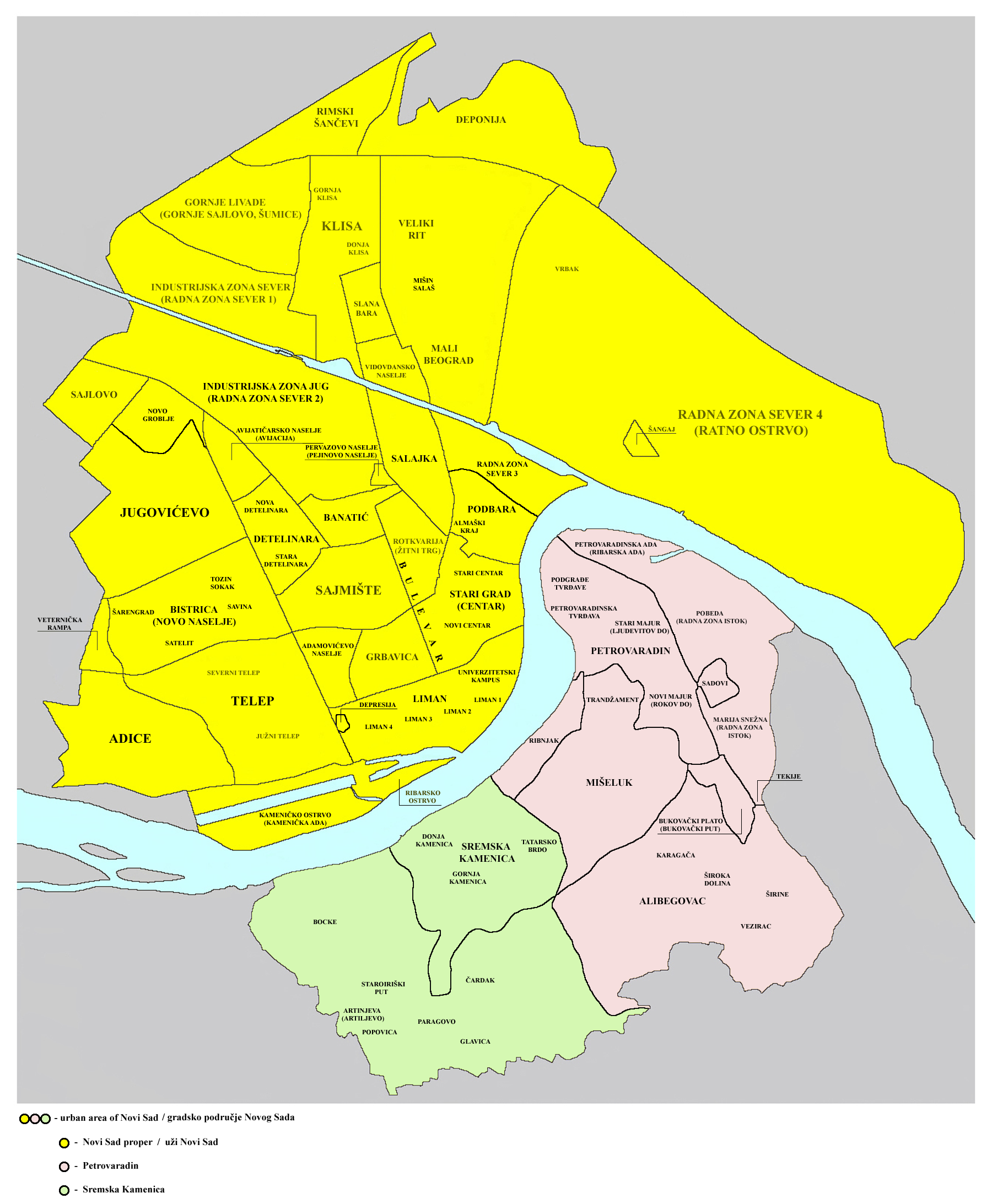
Map of the urban area of Novi Sad with city quarters, showing the location of Klisa

Klisa is located in the northern part of Novi Sad, between Klisanski breg and Industrijska Zona Sever in the west, Industrijska Zona Jug in the south, Vidovdansko Naselje, Slana Bara and Veliki Rit in the east, and Rimski Šančevi and Deponija in the north.

== Parts of the neighborhood ==
Klisa is divided into two parts: Gornja Klisa ("upper Klisa") and Donja Klisa ("lower Klisa"). The nearby neighborhood of Slana Bara is sometimes also seen as a third part of Klisa.

== History ==
In the territory of present-day Gornja Klisa, there was an ancient human settlement dating from 1000 BC. This is the oldest known human settlement in the present-day territory of Novi Sad.

In the medieval period (13th-16th century), a settlements named Gornje Sajlovo (Zajol) and Vašaroš Varad (Vásárosvárad) existed at this location.

== Population ==
Klisa's population consists mostly of Serbs and Romani people.

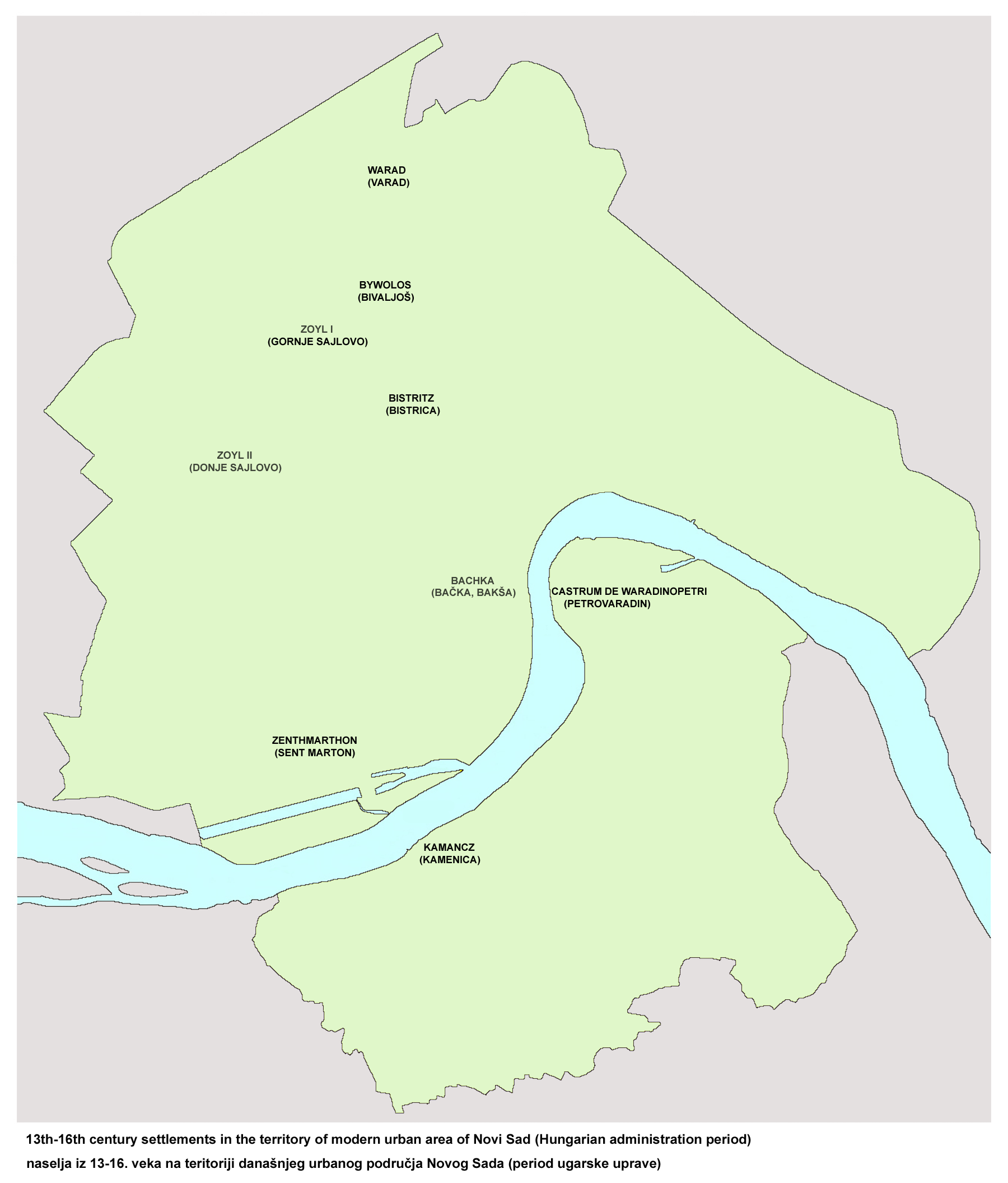
Medieval settlements of Gornje Sajlovo and Vašaroš Varad in the location of modern Klisa (13th-16th century)

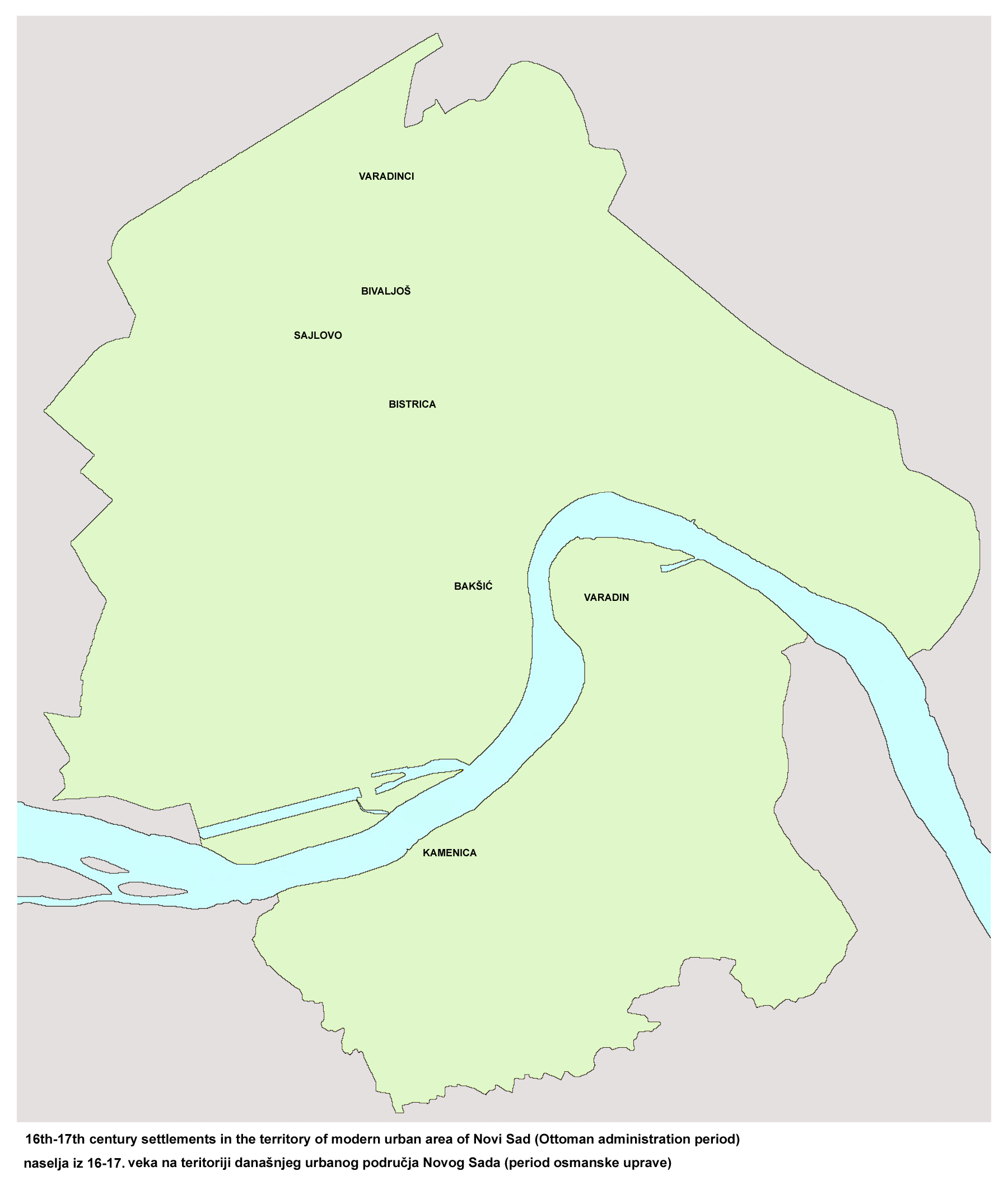
Settlements of Sajlovo and Varadinci in the location of modern Klisa during Ottoman administration (16th-17th century)

== Gallery ==
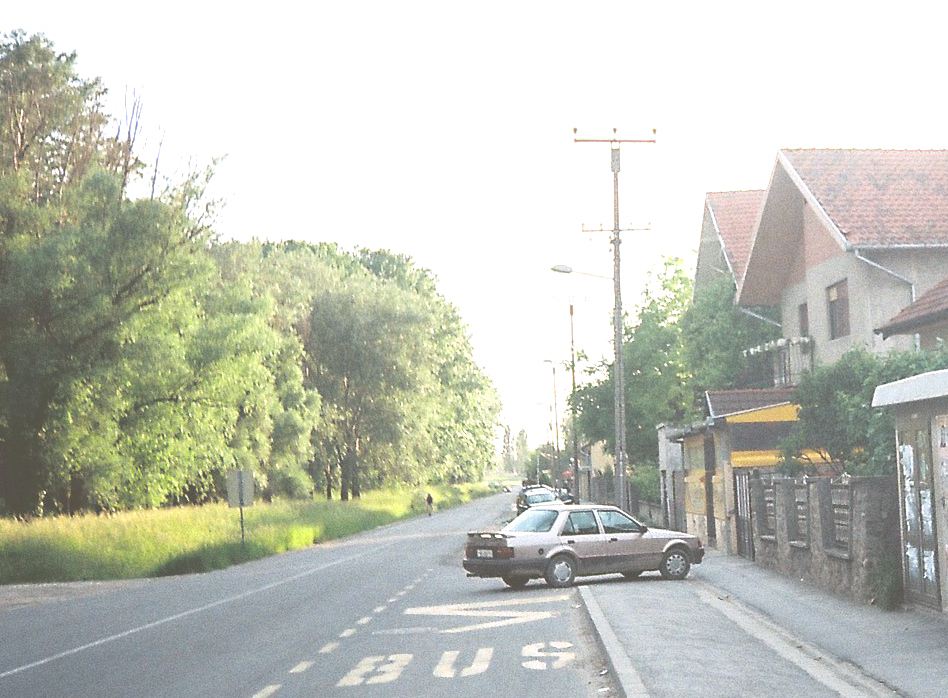
Street in southern part of Klisa (western part of Slana Bara)

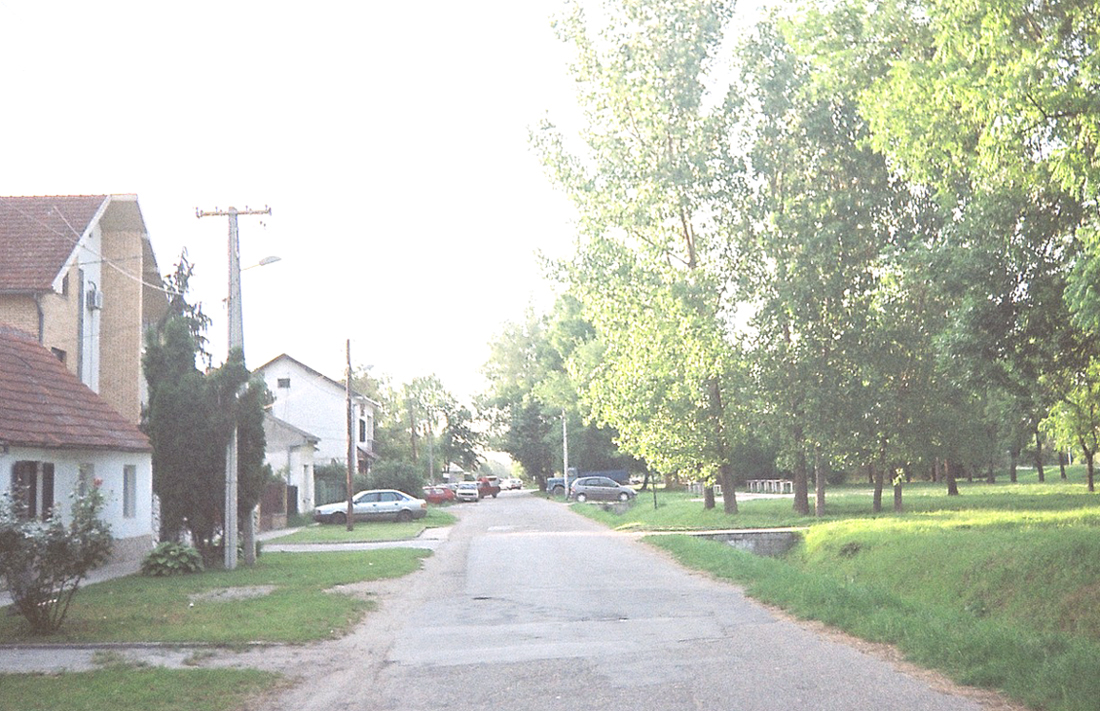
Street in southern part of Klisa (western part of Slana Bara)

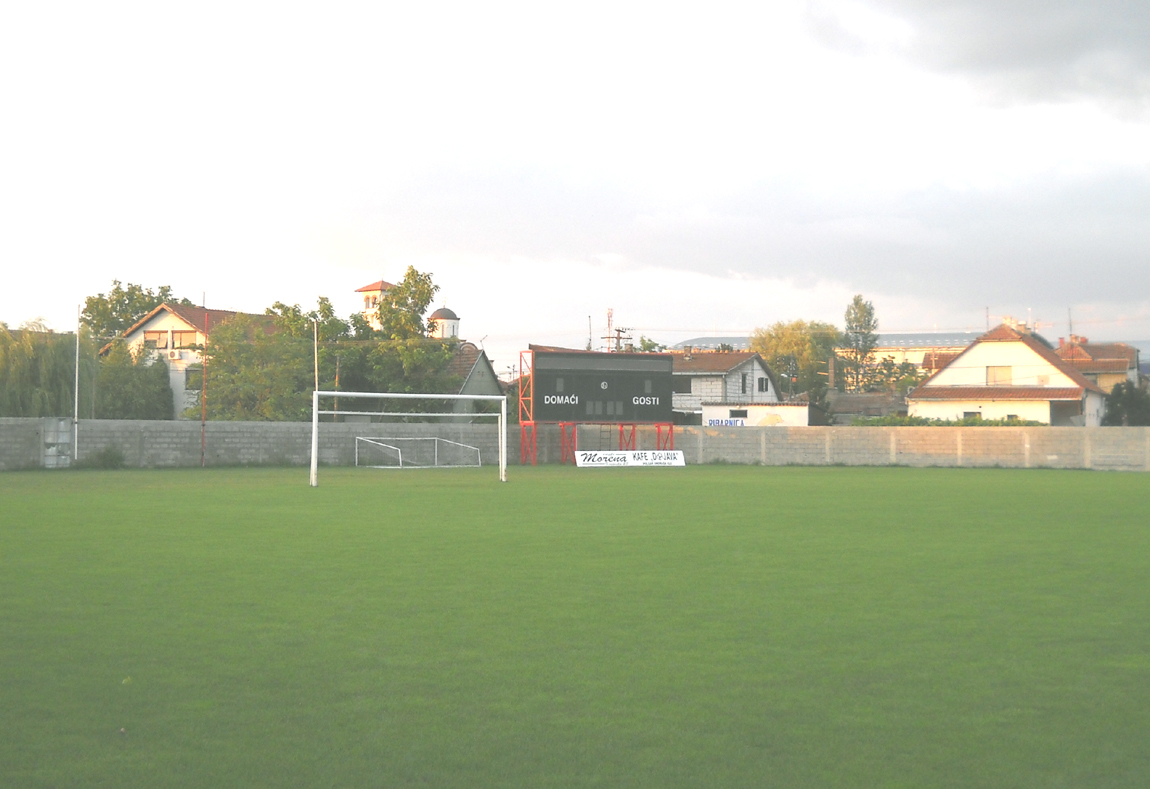
FK Proleter football stadium in southern part of Klisa (western part of Slana Bara)

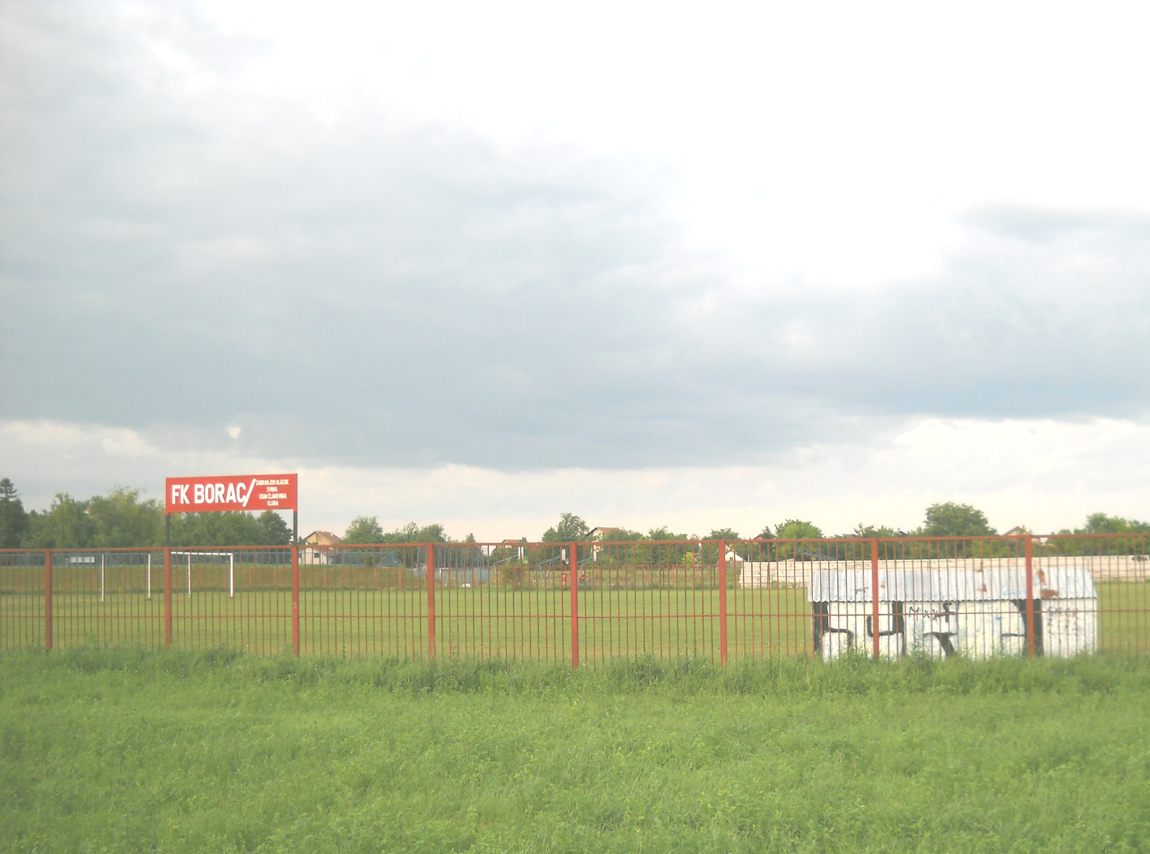
FK Borac football stadium in Klisa

== Features ==
The district prison is located in the northern part of Klisa.

== See also ==
- Neighborhoods of Novi Sad
