= Vidovdansko Naselje =

Vidovdansko Naselje Видовданско Насеље
- Urban neighborhood
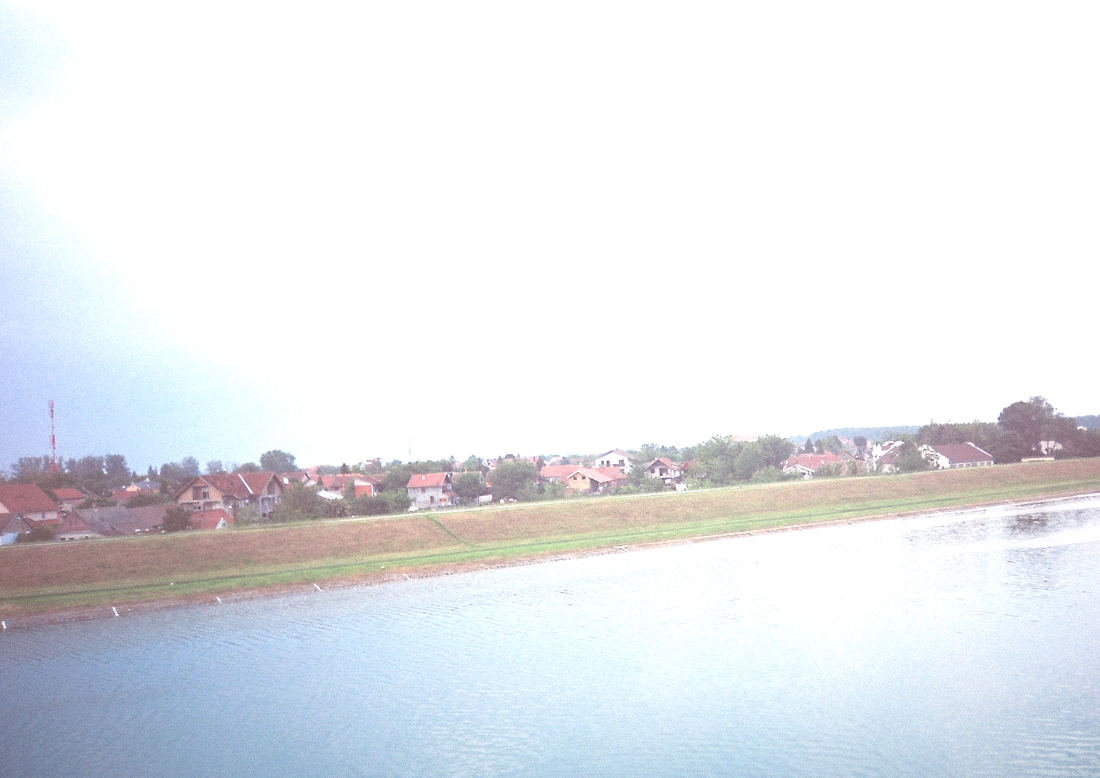
- Panoramic view of Vidovdansko Naselje
- Interactive map of Vidovdansko Naselje
- Country: Serbia
- Province: Vojvodina
- District: South Bačka
- Municipality: Novi Sad

Area
  - Total: 3.03 km^{2} (1.17 sq mi)
- Time zone: UTC+1 (CET)
  - Summer (DST): UTC+2 (CEST)
- Area code: +381(0)21
- Car plates: NS

Vidovdansko Naselje (Serbian: Видовданско Насеље) is an urban neighborhood of the city of Novi Sad, Serbia.

== Name ==
Name of the neighborhood derived from Vidovdan, the Serbian veneration of Saint Vitus, thus the English translation of the settlement's name would be "the Saint Vitus day's settlement". Saint Vitus is also the patron saint of the neighborhood and stone cross dedicated to him was erected in 1929.

== Location ==
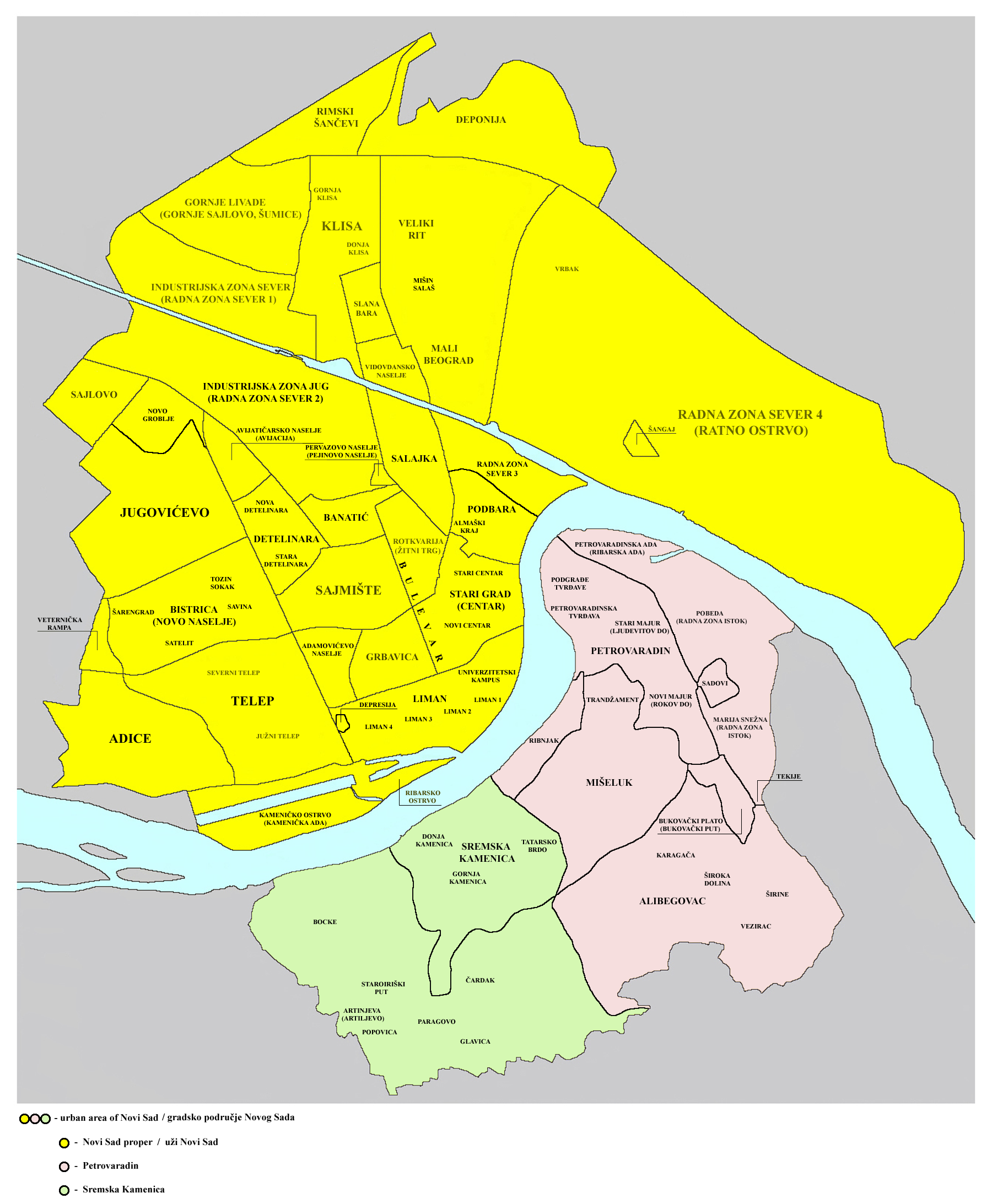
Map of the urban area of Novi Sad with city quarters, showing the location of Vidovdansko Naselje

Vidovdansko Naselje is located in northern part of Novi Sad, between Klisa in the west, Salajka in the south, Mali Beograd in the east, and Slana Bara in the north.

== History ==
During NATO bombing of Novi Sad in 1999, civilian residential buildings in Vidovdansko Naselje were devastated by NATO bombs.

== Features ==
Well known Najlon market (Najlon pijaca in Serbian) is located in Vidovdansko Naselje. Every Sunday, it is the largest market place in Novi Sad where various goods and services are offered for visitors.

== See also ==
- Neighborhoods of Novi Sad
