= Mali Beograd, Novi Sad =

Mali Beograd Мали Београд
- Urban neighborhood
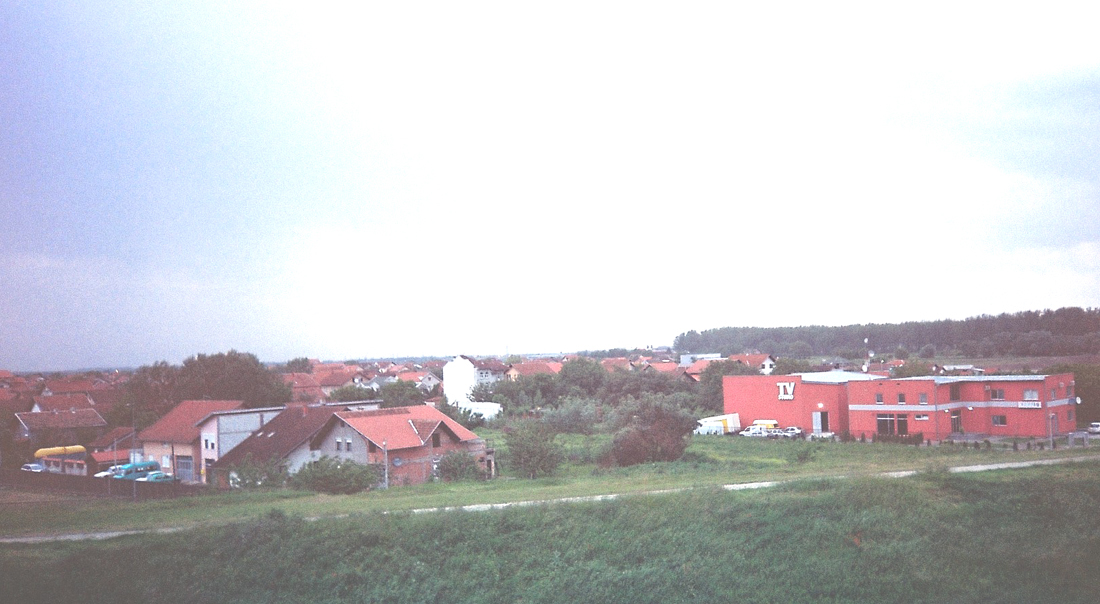
- Panoramic view of Mali Beograd

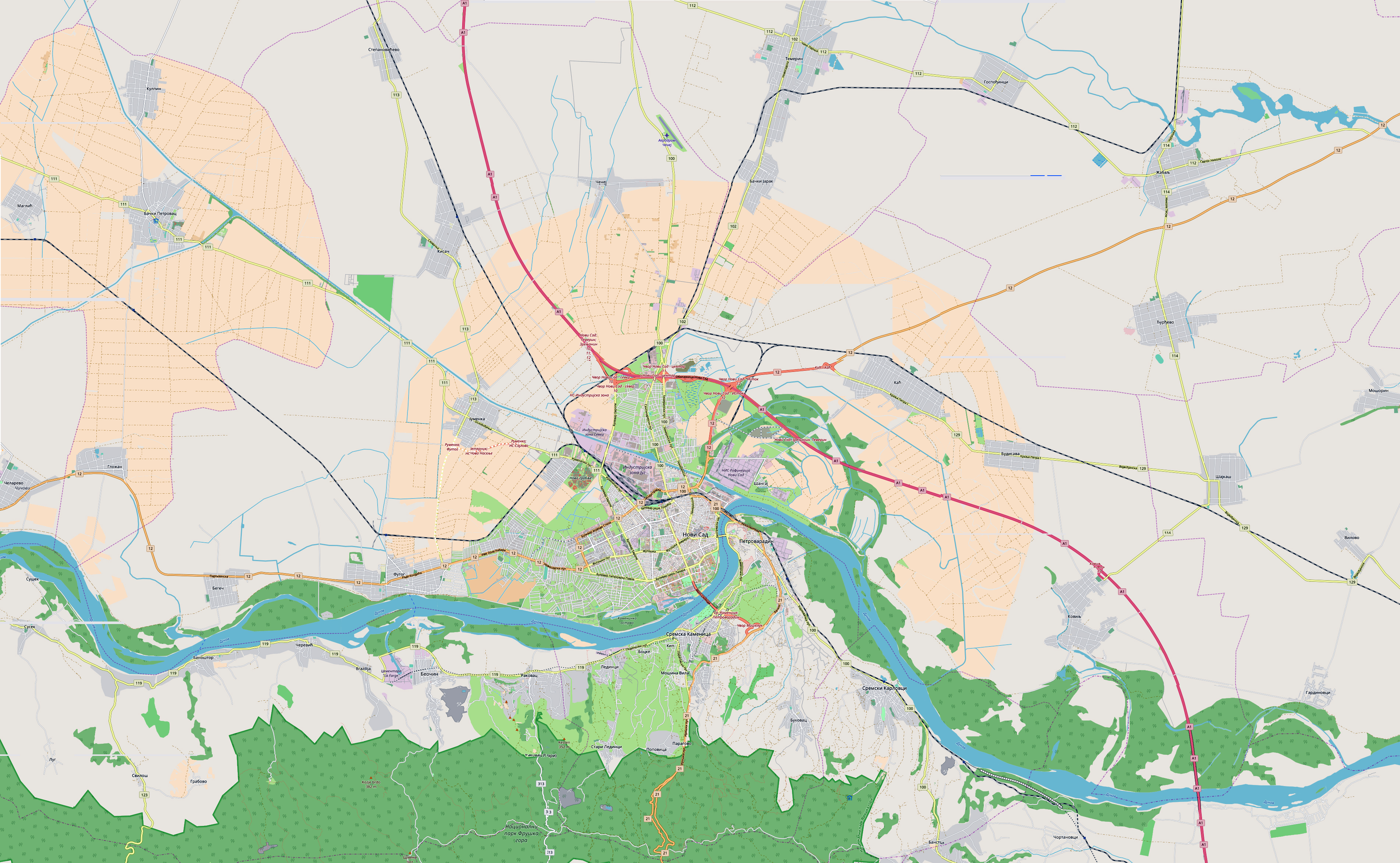
- Location within Novi Sad
- Coordinates: 45°17′07″N 19°50′29″E
- Country: Serbia
- Time zone: UTC+1 (CET)
  - Summer (DST): UTC+2 (CEST)

Mali Beograd is an urban neighborhood of the city of Novi Sad, Serbia. It is located on the northern bank of Danube-Tisa-Danube canal, between Vidovdansko Naselje and Oil Refinery. Large number of inhabitants of Mali Beograd are ethnic Roma.

== See also ==
- Neighborhoods of Novi Sad
