= Ćaci u školu =

Misspelled Serbian graffiti that became a political symbol

- Ћаци у школу (Serbian)
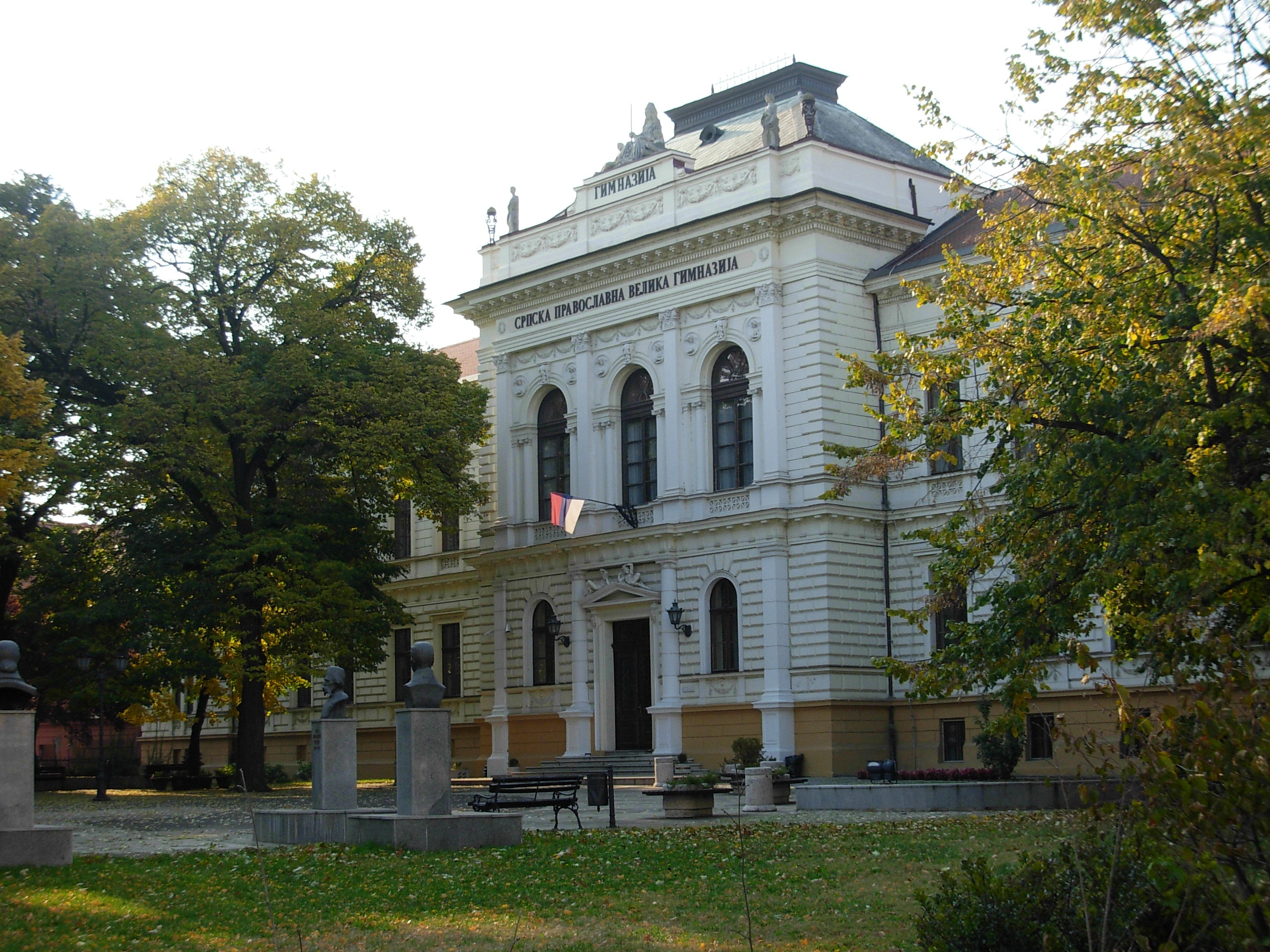
- The Jovan Jovanović Zmaj Gymnasium in Novi Sad, where the graffiti appeared
- Completion date: 22 January 2025
- Medium: Graffiti
- Location: Jovan Jovanović Zmaj Gymnasium, Novi Sad, Serbia; 45.2577°N 19.8485°E

"Ćaci u školu" (Serbian Cyrillic: Ћаци у школу) was a piece of graffiti that appeared on 22 January 2025, at the entrance to the Jovan Jovanović Zmaj Gymnasium in Novi Sad, Serbia. Written in Serbian Cyrillic and painted in red on a fence post, the graffiti was intended to read "Đaci u školu" (Serbian Cyrillic: Ђаци у школу, lit. 'Students to school'), but mistakenly used the letter ћ (ć) instead of ђ (đ). The misspelling attracted widespread attention and became a subject of humor and criticism. The term "ćaci" later became a derogatory term for supporters of the Serbian Progressive Party (SNS).

== Background ==
The Jovan Jovanović Zmaj Gymnasium is one of Serbia’s oldest and most respected secondary education institutions, founded in 1810. The graffiti emerged during a time marked by ongoing social and political tensions in Serbia. Prior to the appearance of the graffiti, the gymnasium had been the site of student and teacher protests, including a blockade opposing administrative decisions made by the school’s principal. These protests were also linked with solidarity actions concerning the Novi Sad railway station canopy collapse, which resulted in 16 fatalities.

At the same time, Serbia was experiencing a nationwide teachers’ strike, motivated by demands for better pay and improved working conditions.

== The graffiti and its discovery ==
On the morning of January 22, 2025, the graffiti was discovered painted in red on a fence post at the entrance courtyard of the gymnasium. The message intended to read "Đaci u školu" ("Students to school"), but the author mistakenly used the Cyrillic letter Ć (Ћ) instead of Đ (Ђ). This orthographic error produced the word "ćaci", which does not exist in standard Serbian and generated confusion and attention.

The misspelling quickly overshadowed the intended message. The graffiti was widely interpreted as an illiterate appeal directed toward striking students and teachers, urging them to return to school. Some commentators suggested the piece reflected poorly on its author, characterizing it as an awkward or clumsy attempt to intervene in the ongoing dispute, while others placed it within a broader political discourse.

Subsequently, the original graffiti was modified by covering the word "ćaci" and replacing it with "ćalci", a colloquial Serbian term meaning "dads," thus changing the phrase to "Dads to school".

== Viral phenomenon and public reaction ==
The graffiti’s image quickly spread across various Serbian social media platforms, attracting a mixture of humorous reactions, satire, and criticism. Students from the gymnasium humorously awarded the unknown author a "gold medal for the worst knowledge of Cyrillic", which was physically attached next to the graffiti on the fence. A satirical event on Facebook, titled "Tražimo Ćacija da ga pošaljemo u školu" ("Let's find Ćaci to send him to school"), was organized and scheduled for January 24, 2025, garnering considerable online attention. The phrase and misspelling inspired the creation of various memes, jokes, and discussions. Notably, wordplays such as "Prelazak Đ u Ć – lojalizacija" ("The shift from Đ to Ć – loyalization") circulated, humorously linking the orthographic mistake to political loyalty or alignment.

On August 27, 2025, Serbian Progressive Party leader and former Prime Minister Miloš Vučević accused Marija Vasić, a professor of the gymnasium, of writing this graffiti, alleging it was intended as part of a campaign to depict members of the party as illiterate, uncultured, and uneducated, without substantiating the claim.

== Cultural and political impact ==
While initially a humorous anecdote, the phrase ćaci gradually acquired additional cultural and political significance. The term came to be used, especially in online discourse, as a pejorative to describe individuals perceived as uncritically loyal to the government or lacking critical thinking.

Academic observers have noted that anti-government protesters adopted the term strategically as a tool of satire directed at government supporters and pro-government demonstrations. One prominent example is the naming of the Ćaciland, a counter-protest camp established in Pioneers Park in Belgrade. The name connected the protest site to the original graffiti and served as a symbol within the ongoing political contestation.

In June 2025, new graffiti appeared at the same gymnasium reading "Ćaci je živ" ("Ćaci is alive"), echoing the famous post-World War II slogan "Tito je živ" ("Tito is alive"). Another inscription, "Gde ste naci" ("Where are you, Nazis"), was painted nearby, referencing a controversial statement by President Aleksandar Vučić, who had remarked it was "better to be a ćaci than a Nazi," a phrase used by some supporters in political discourse.

== See also ==
- Ćaciland
- 2024–2026 Serbian anti-corruption protests
- Graffiti
- Internet meme
