= Ćacilend =

Pro-government encampment in Belgrade, Serbia (2025–2026)

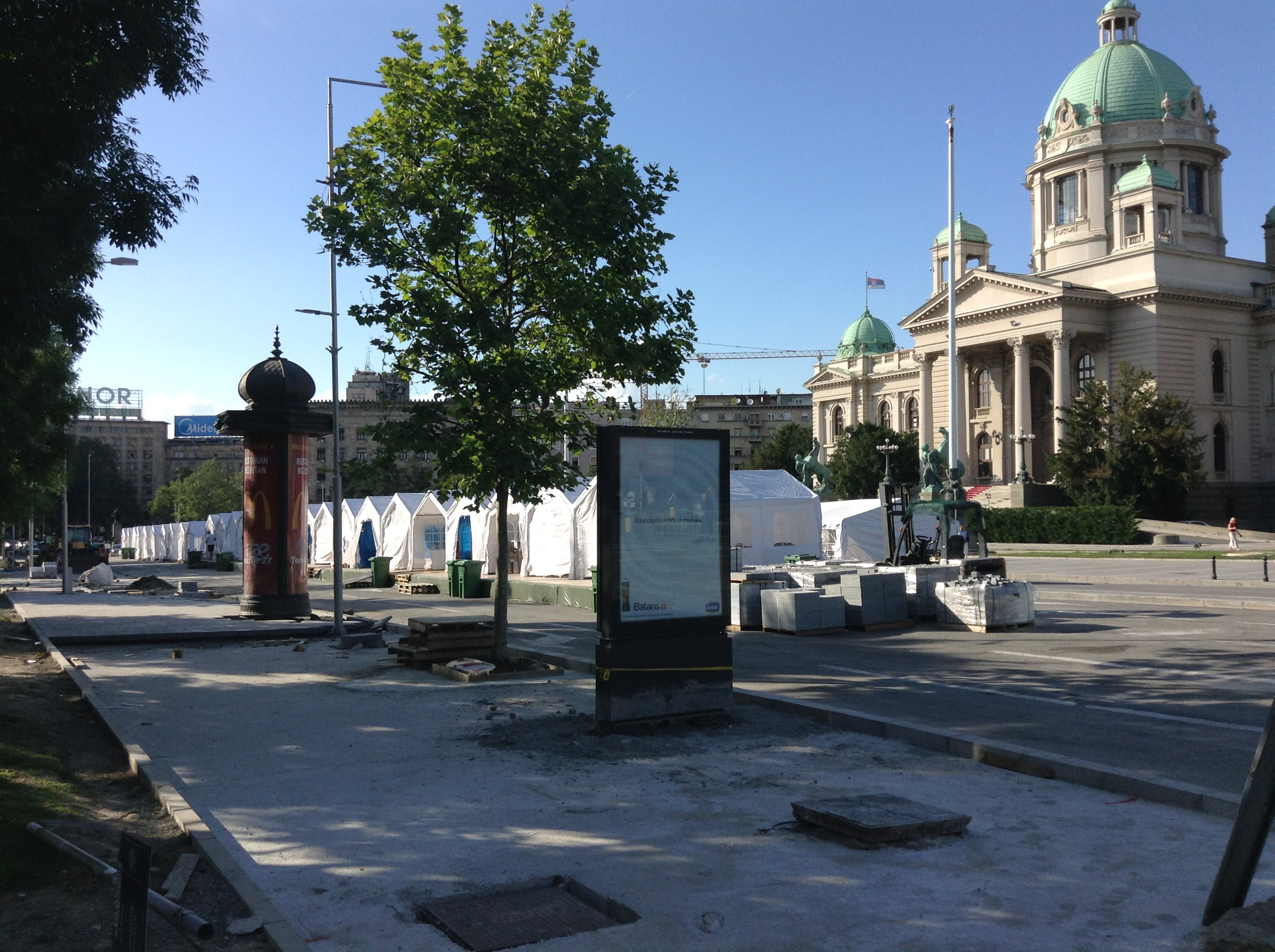
- The camp in May 2025
- Native name: Ћациленд
- Date: 6 March 2025 – 25 October 2026
- Location: Pionirski Park and Nikola Pašić Square, Belgrade, Serbia
- Cause: 2024–2026 Serbian anti-corruption protests
- Participants: "Students 2.0" ("Students Who Want to Study") and other supporters of the Serbian Progressive Party
- Outcome: Dismantled by citizens on the night of the 2026 Serbian parliamentary election

Ćacilend (ˈt͡ɕɑːt͡siˌlɛnd; Serbian Cyrillic: Ћациленд), also spelled Ćaciland (CHA-tsee-lənd; ˈt͡ʃæːt͡siˌlənd), was a protest camp in Pionirski Park, in front of the Novi Dvor, seat of the president of Serbia in central Belgrade, set up in March 2025 by supporters of the ruling Serbian Progressive Party (SNS) in opposition to the student-led anti-corruption protests and the blockades of universities. Its first residents called themselves "Students 2.0" or "students who want to study". The camp expanded to Nikola Pašić Square in front of the House of the National Assembly in April 2025, before that part was removed at the end of the year.

The camp was fenced off and closed to the public, and journalists, activists and politicians were attacked in and around it on several occasions. In October 2025, the European Parliament described it as an "illegal encampment". On 25 October 2026, after Aleksandar Vučić conceded defeat in the parliamentary election, several hundred citizens removed the fences and tore down the tents, destroying the camp.

== Name ==
The name is derived from ćaci. In January 2025, an unknown person spray-painted "Ćaci u školu" on the entrance of the Jovan Jovanović Zmaj Gymnasium in Novi Sad, misspelling the slogan Đaci u školu ("Pupils, back to school"). The misspelling spread on social media, and protesters began to call supporters of the government ćaci, mocking their supposed lack of education. Ćacilend therefore means "land of the ćaci".

== History ==
=== Background ===
On 1 November 2024, the concrete canopy of the Novi Sad railway station collapsed, eventually killing 16 people. The disaster triggered mass protests led by university students, who blocked faculties across Serbia; secondary school students later joined the blockades.

=== Establishment ===
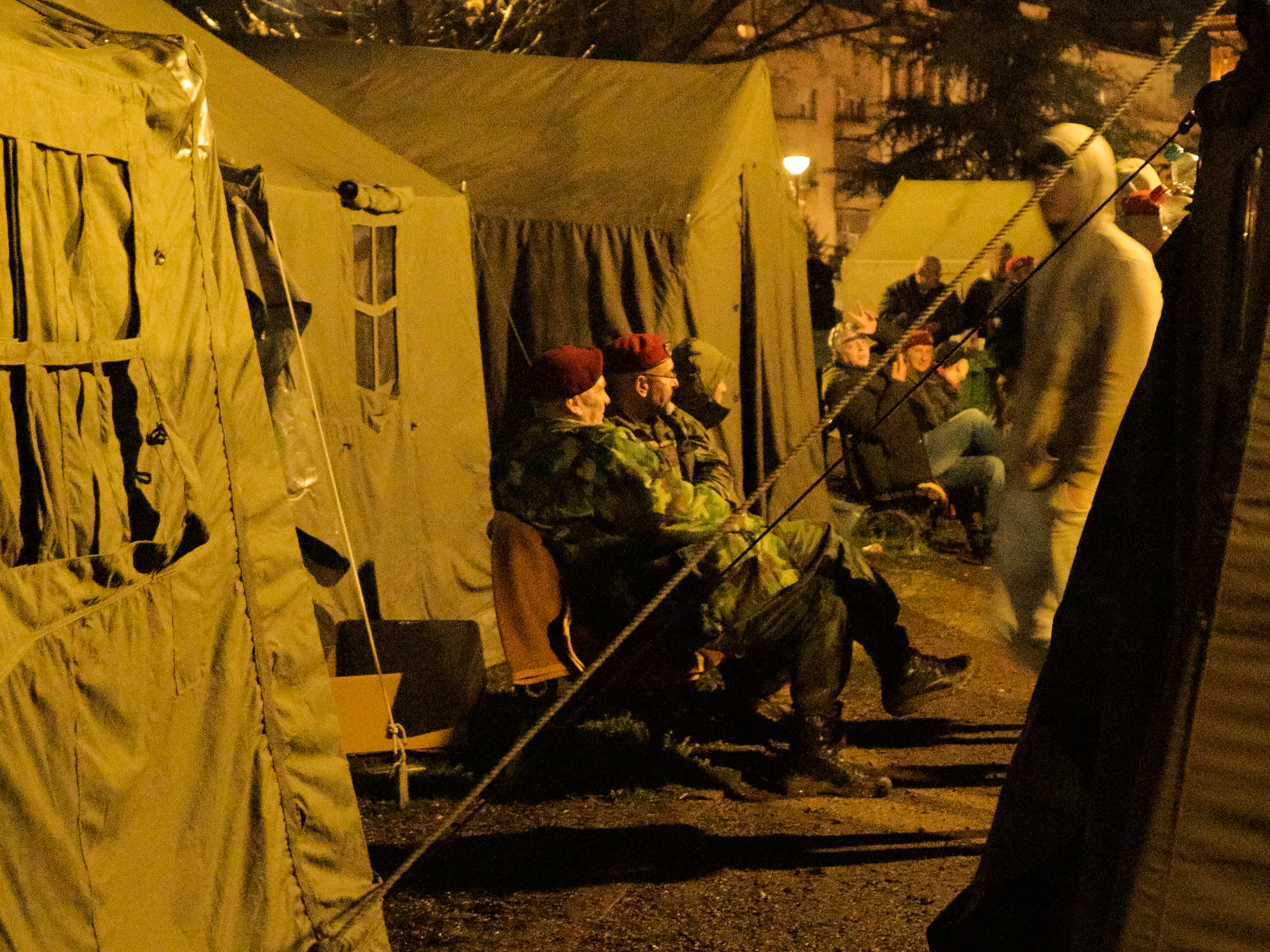
JSO veterans in the camp on 11 March 2025

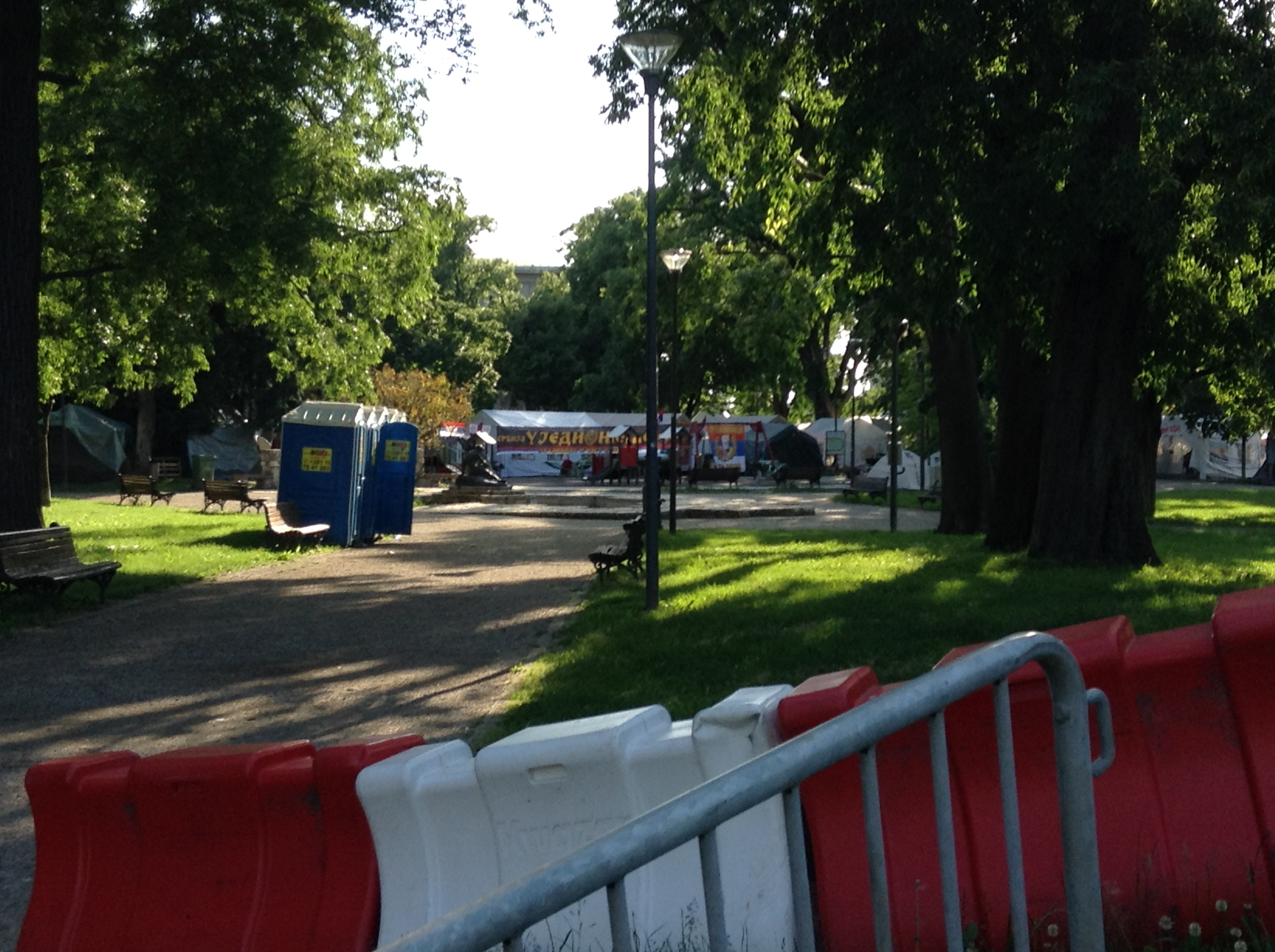
Tents in the park, surrounded by a fence

On the evening of 6 March 2025, several dozen members of the newly founded "Students 2.0" movement, which opposed the faculty blockades, set up tents in Pionirski Park, saying that they would stay until their demands were met. These included a plan for making up missed classes, a return to classes by 17 March, more exam periods and a moratorium on student loans; Miloš Pavlović, a student at the Faculty of Medicine, spoke on the group's behalf. The camp was set up nine days before the protest of 15 March 2025, one of the largest in the country's history. Independent media and the opposition described the camp as organised by the SNS, and reported that some of its residents were not students.

A double wall of tractors secures the camp in the park ahead of the protest on 15 March 2025

Although the park is under state protection, it was fenced off, and during the protest of 15 March it was also surrounded by tractors; only registered persons were allowed to enter, and the area was guarded by the camp's residents and the police. Students of the Faculty of Biology of the University of Belgrade warned that the camp endangered the park's protected plant species, including sweet chestnut, ginkgo and English oak, and violated almost all provisions of the decision on its protection.

=== Expansion and incidents ===
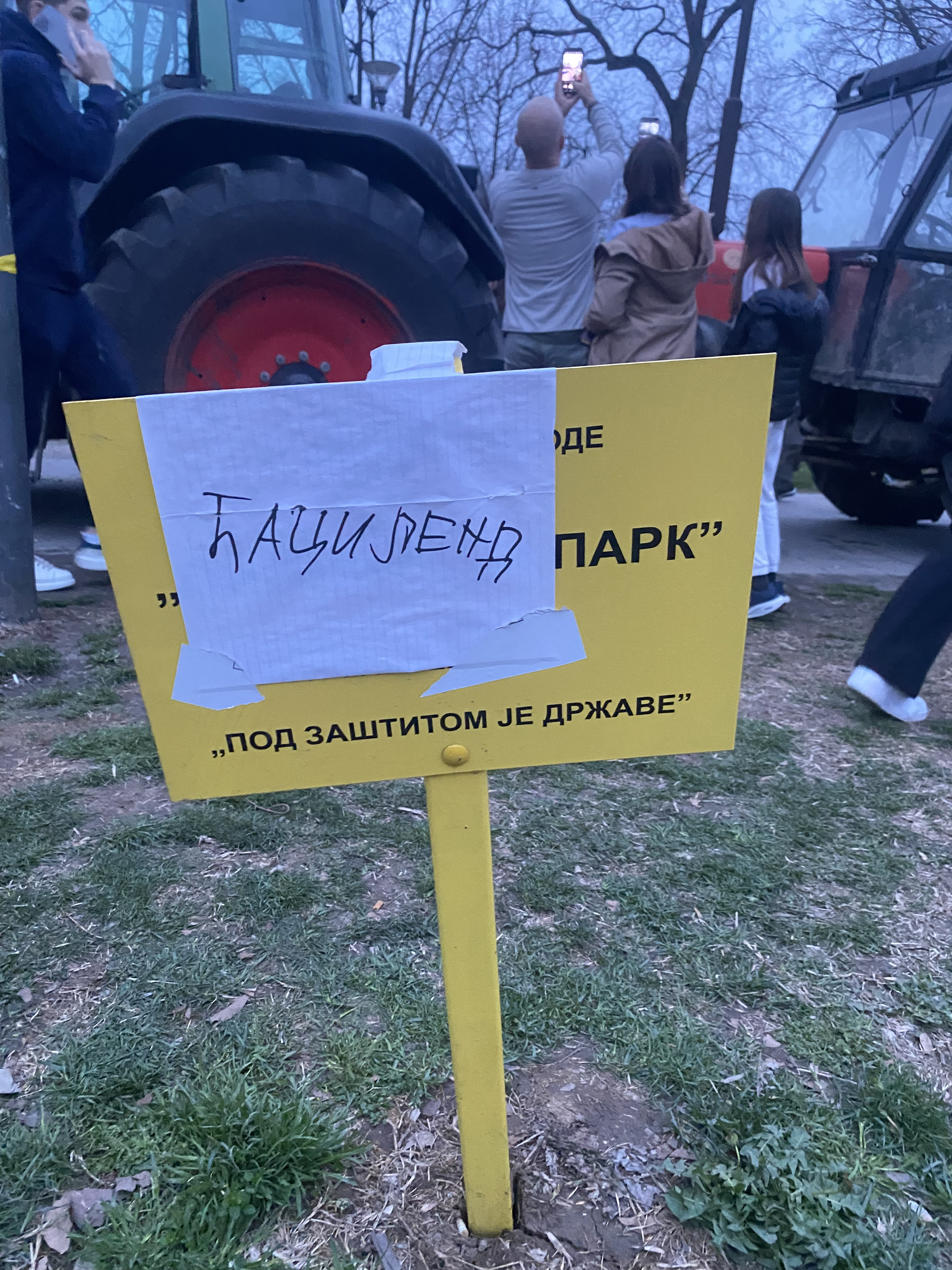
The sign "Pionirski Park – under the protection of the state", covered by protesters with a "Ćacilend" sticker

A sticker put on a fence of the camp by protesters that reads "It is strictly prohibited to feed ćacis"

In April 2025, ahead of a government rally addressed by Vučić, the camp spread to Nikola Pašić Square, blocking traffic in front of the National Assembly; fences and concrete barriers were later placed at the surrounding intersections, with booths that required accreditation to pass. Over the following months, activists, politicians and journalists were attacked in the area; according to media, opposition parties, civil society and students, the attackers were often people with criminal records who stayed at the camp. In March 2025, Nemanja Šarović was attacked near the park while filming the tractors.

In its resolution of 22 October 2025, the European Parliament referred to the "illegal encampment in Pionirski park" and expressed grave concern "about multiple reports of individuals with criminal backgrounds being mobilised by the ruling party in counter-protest activities, attacking protesters with pyrotechnics, further escalating tensions, violence and polarisation in the country". On the same day, a 70-year-old man shot and wounded a resident of the camp in a tent after an argument over political views; a bullet hit a gas cylinder, and the tent burned down. Vučić called the shooting a "terrible terrorist attack", while the prosecution charged the suspect with attempted murder.

=== Reduction ===
In late December 2025, Vučić visited the camp and thanked its residents for having "guarded and defended Serbia", announcing that the part in the street would be removed while the part in the park would remain for some time. The street between the National Assembly and the park was cleared shortly before New Year, and traffic was restored on 4 January 2026. By September 2026, only around ten large tents remained in the park; journalists found six people inside and were refused entry, with the police saying that a public gathering was still being held there. In October 2026, the Ministry of Internal Affairs did not answer questions about who had registered the gathering and how long it would last.

=== Dismantling ===
On the evening of the parliamentary election on 25 October 2026, shortly after Vučić conceded defeat, several hundred citizens celebrating the victory of the Student List removed the fence on the side facing the National Assembly, entered the park and tore down the tents. The residents of the camp had left beforehand, and the Gendarmery, which had been stationed near the park during the evening, did not intervene. The day after, cleaning efforts were organised by citizen movements and communal services, and the park was mostly restored to its pre-Ćacilend state.

== Controversies ==
=== Threats of lawsuits against media ===
In May 2025, letters signed in the name of "Students Who Want to Study" were sent to several independent media outlets, announcing SLAPP lawsuits and criminal complaints over "baseless, tendentious and offensive comments" about Vučić, the SNS and the association, which they described as defamation. According to N1, the letters used official state symbols, and lawyers described the threats as vague, as they did not specify which reports were considered defamatory.

The letters named three influencers, Aleksandar "Cile ST" Leštarić, Danica Manojlović and Luka Lekić, as "Meta advisers" who were allegedly planning to have the social media accounts of independent media suspended. All three said that the claims had "no basis in truth" and that their names had been misused in retaliation for their support for the protests. According to Raskrikavanje, the SNS and "Students Who Want to Study" also distanced themselves from the letters.

=== Attacks on journalists ===
According to the media freedom website Cenzolovka, journalists were repeatedly attacked in and around the camp, often in the presence of police officers who did not intervene. Reporters from KTV, FoNet, Insajder and N1, as well as a YouTuber, were threatened, physically assaulted or prevented from reporting. Lawyers and former police officials quoted by Cenzolovka said that the authorities' inaction contributed to a climate of impunity.

== Reactions ==
Student protesters, citizens and local assemblies of Belgrade residents criticised the camp, and several protests were held demanding its removal; its legality was also questioned. Analysts quoted by Danas described it as an attempt to intimidate students and citizens and as the "last line of defence of the regime". The authorities and their supporters, on the other hand, regarded "Students 2.0" as legitimate. Vučić called Ćacilend "a symbol of resistance" and the only place in the country where "those who think differently" could gather.

== See also ==
- 2024–2026 Serbian anti-corruption protests
- Novi Sad railway station canopy collapse
- 2025 Belgrade stampede
- Ćaci u školu
- Pioneers Park, Belgrade
