= Olga Hadžić =

Serbian mathematician (1946–2019)

Olga Hadžić (25 August 1946 – 23 January 2019) was a Serbian mathematician known for her work on fixed-point theorems.

== Early life and education ==
Hadžić was born in Novi Sad, on 25 August 1946, the daughter of lawyer Lazar Hadžić and the granddaughter of writer and physician Ilija Ognjanović. She attended both the Jovan Jovanović Zmaj Gymnasium and a music school in Novi Sad. She earned a degree in mathematics at the University of Novi Sad in 1968, and continued there as an assistant, earning a master's degree through the Faculty of Natural Sciences And Mathematics at the University of Belgrade in 1970, and completing a doctorate at the University of Novi Sad in 1972. Her doctoral dissertation, Neki problemi diferencijalnog računa u lokalno konveksnim prostorima [Some problems of differential calculus in locally convex spaces], was supervised by Bogoljub Stanković.

Later in life, she took up the study of tourism management and marketing, earning a master's degree in 2005 from the University of Novi Sad and a second doctorate in 2006, supervised by Jovan Romelić.

== Career and later life ==
Hadžić spent her career at the University of Novi Sad, becoming an assistant professor there in 1973, associate professor in 1977, and full professor in 1981. She became rector of the university in 1996, the first woman in Serbia to achieve this position.

She was the founding editor-in-chief of the mathematics journal Univerzitet u Novom Sadu, Zbornik Radova Prirodno-Matematičkog Fakulteta, Serija za Matemati [University of Novi Sad, Review of Research, Faculty of Science, Mathematics Series], which later became the Novi Sad Journal of Mathematics, from 1971 to 1995.

== Books ==
Hadžić was the author of several books on mathematics, particularly focusing on fixed-point theorems, including:

- Osnovi teorije nepokretne tačke [Foundations of fixed point theory], Institute of Mathematics, Novi Sad, 1978.
- Fixed point theory in topological vector spaces, Institute of Mathematics, Novi Sad, 1984.
- Numeričke i statističke metode u obradi eksperimentalnih podataka [Numerical and statistical methods in processing experimental data], Institute of Mathematics, Novi Sad, 1989.
- Fixed point theory in probabilistic metric spaces, Institute of Mathematics, Novi Sad, 1995.
- Fixed point theory in probabilistic metric spaces, with Endre Pap, Kluwer, 2001.

== Recognition ==
Hadžić was a member of the Serbian Academy of Sciences and Arts, elected in 1991, and also a member of the Vojvodina Academy of Sciences and Arts, elected as a corresponding member in 1984 and a regular member in 1990.
