= Jovan Jovanović Zmaj Gymnasium =

High school in Novi Sad, Serbia

- Гимназија "Јован Јовановић Змај"; Gimnazija "Jovan Jovanović Zmaj"

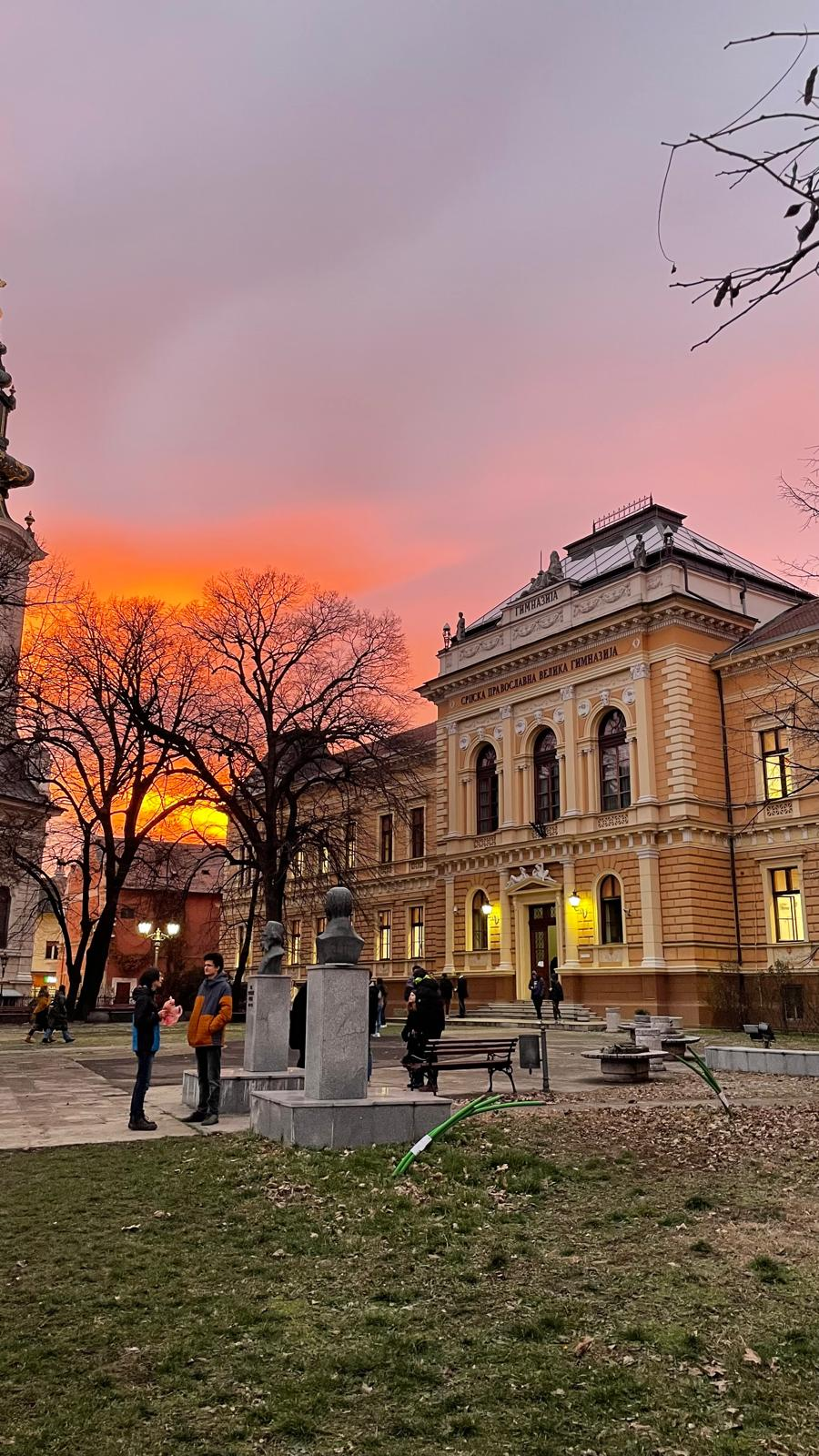

Location
- Zlatne Grede 4 Novi Sad, South Bačka, Vojvodina; Serbia; 45.258193°N 19.847573°E

Information
- School type: Public, comprehensive high school
- Established: 27 January 1810; 216 years ago
- Founder: Sava Vuković, Miloš Bajić
- Status: open
- Principal: Katarina Kovačević (acting)
- Gender: Coeducational
- Enrollment: approx. 1,200
- Language: Serbian, English, French, German, Russian
- Newspaper: Skamija
- Yearbook: "Izveštaj Gimnazije Jovan Jovanović Zmaj"
- Website: www.jjzmaj.edu.rs

Jovan Jovanović Zmaj Gymnasium (Serbian: Гимназија "Јован Јовановић Змај", Gimnazija "Jovan Jovanović Zmaj") is a secondary school in Novi Sad, Serbia. It is named after Jovan Jovanović Zmaj, a Serb poet. It was founded in 1810 by a donation of a wealthy merchant Sava Vuković from Novi Sad. Over the years the school developed into a prestigious institution whose alumni include numerous notable historical individuals.

The school was rebuilt in the 20th century, using the donations of baron Miloš Bajić who gave 20,000 forints.

== Names ==
The school had several names throughout its history.

- Since 27 January 1810: Serbian Grand Orthodox Gymnasium of Novi Sad (Serbian: Српска православна велика гимназија новосадска, Srpska pravoslavna velika gimnazija novosadska).
- Since 27 August 1920: State Men's Gymnasium (Serbian: Државна мушка гимназија, Državna muška gimnazija).
- Since 3 October 1931: State Men's Real Gymnasium of King Alexander I (Serbian: Државна мушка реална гимназија краља Алексaндра I, Državna muška realna gimnazija kralja Aleksandra I).
- Since 13 April 1941: Hungarian Royal State Gymnasium with Serbian language courses (Serbian: Мађарска краљевска државна гимназија са српским наставним језиком, Mađarska kraljevska državna gimnazija sa srpskim nastavnim jezikom).
- Since 28 February 1945: Creation of the Women's Real Gymnasium (Serbian: Женска реална гимназијa, Ženska realna gimnazija), Men's Real Gymnasium (Serbian: Мушка реална гимназијa, Muška realna gimnazija) and Mixed Real Gymnasium (Serbian: Мешовитa реална гимназијa, Mešovita realna gimnazija). Mixed Gymnasium moved into the current gymnasium building on the 30 June 1945. The "Real" status was removed from these gymnasiums in 1948.
- Since the school year of 1950/1951: The Women's Gymnasium (Serbian: Женска гимназијa, Ženska gimnazija) and Men's Gymnasium (Serbian: Мушка гимназијa, Muška gimnazija) moved into the current gymnasium building, merging into the First Mixed Gymnasium (Serbian: I мешовитa гимназијa, I mešovita gimnazija). Then Mixed Gymnasium was renamed into the Second Mixed Gymnasium (Serbian: II мешовитa гимназијa, II mešovita gimnazija).
- Since 1952: First Mixed Gymnasium is renamed into Svetozar Marković Secondary Mixed Gymnasium (Serbian: Виша мешовита гимназија "Светозар Марковић", Viša mešovita gimnazija "Svetozar Marković"), while the Second Mixed Gymnasium is renamed into Jovan Jovanović Zmaj Secondary Mixed Gymnasium (Serbian: Виша мешовита гимназија "Јован Јовановић Змај", Viša mešovita gimnazija "Jovan Jovanović Zmaj").
- Since the school year of 1959/1960: Both mixed schools merge into one, named Jovan Jovanović Zmaj Gymnasium.
- Since the school year of 1977/1978: The Center for the education of staff in social activities (Serbian: Центар за образовање кадрова у друштвеним делатностима, Centar za obrazovanje kadrova u društvenim delatnostima) began operating, in the spirit of educational reforms from the 10th Congress of the League of Communists of Yugoslavia.
- Since the school year of 1983/1984: The school returned to 4 years of education (two classes of common secondary education and two classes of vocational-oriented secondary education) and is renamed into Jovan Jovanović Zmaj Secondary Science-Mathematics School (Serbian: Средња природно-математичка школа "Јован Јовановић Змај", Srednja prirodno-matematička škola "Jovan Jovanović Zmaj").
- Since 1985: The school celebrates 175 years of educational work and is renamed into Jovan Jovanović Zmaj Secondary Science-Mathematics Gymnasium (Serbian: Средња природно-математематичка гимназија "Јован Јовановић Змај", Srednja prirodno-matematička gimnazija "Jovan Jovanović Zmaj").
- Since the school year of 1990/1991: The school is renamed back to Jovan Jovanović Zmaj Gymnasium.

== History ==
=== 19th century ===
==== Founding of the school ====
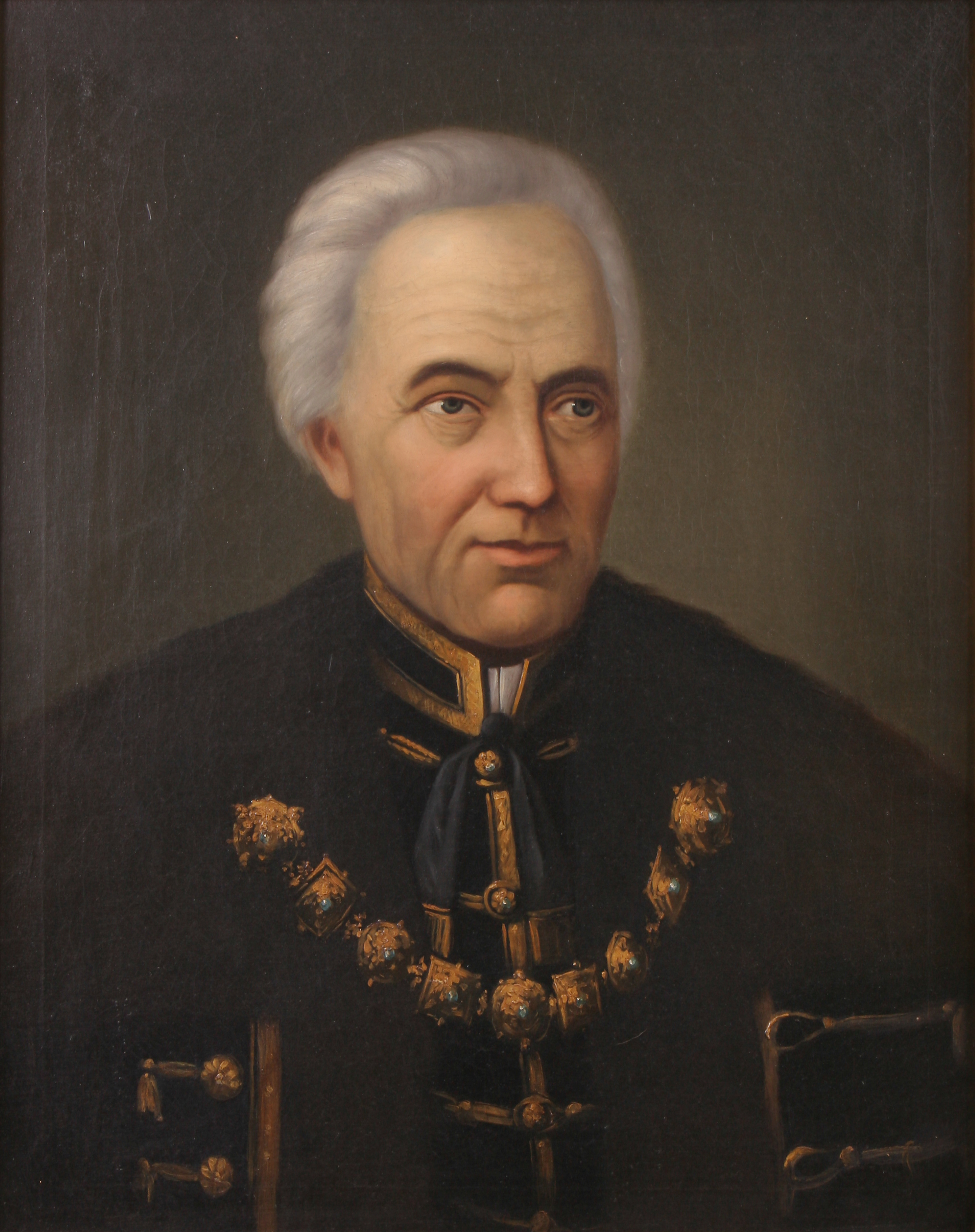
Sava Vuković portrait, Novi Sad, Museum of Vojvodina.

The story of secondary education in Novi Sad started in 1731. At the same spot where the modern building of the school stands, the bishop of Bačka Visaion Pavlović founded a school whose name was "Latino-Slavic Nativity of the Mother of God School". Bishop Pavlović and the council of the Serbian Orthodox Church were aware of the fact that only a good education in Latin can provide better future for Serbian people in Habsburg Monarchy. Among the best-known students of this school there were Joakim Vujić and Lukijan Mušicki, and the best-known teacher was Zaharije Orfelin. This school continued its work till 1789 when the Serbs from Novi Sad led by promises and reforms of Emperor Joseph II abolished this educational institution in order to make a gymnasium for all religions in Novi Sad. For this purpose they gave the building and the whole inventory of the school. A fast crash of Joseph's reforms, showed all the haste and imprudence of this gesture, since instead of the state gymnasium for all religions in the orthodox part of Novi Sad, a Roman Catholic school was founded.

Because of that Metropolitan Bishop of Karlovci Stefan Stratimirović, Bishop of Bačka Gedeon Petrović and the council of the Eastern Orthodox Church in Novi Sad had a great wish to reopen Serbian Grand Orthodox Gymnasium beside the Roman Catholic one. Lack of higher education institutions forced Serbian youth in Habsburg Monarchy to continue their education in Roman Catholic or Protestant schools which had in itself a fear of distancing them from Serbian religion and nation. By that time, Novi Sad became the economical and cultural center of the Serbs in the Habsburg Monarchy, warranting the creation of separate school for the Serbs.

At the beginning of the nineteenth century, a prominent merchant from Novi Sad, Sava Vuković of Beregsova, wanted to leave a permanent legacy through his philanthropic work. On Saint Sava's Day 1810, blind and seriously ill, Vuković donated 20 000 forints for foundation of a Serbian gymnasium in Novi Sad.

In the inaugural letter of Sava Vuković, three basic tasks which the school should fulfill were stated: general education and upbringing in national spirit through the Eastern Orthodox religion and national language. A great number of people from Novi Sad joined this noble act encouraged by Bishop of Bačka Gedeon Petrović and Metropolitan Bishop of Karlovci Stefan Stratimirović, and in this way more than 100,000 forints were collected which was enough for the foundation of school. Habsburg Emperor Francis II gave his consent for the foundation of the school on 11 December 1811. However, not everything was finished with this emperor's agreement, only on 31 January 1816 the foundation act was confirmed and the conditions for opening the first and second grade, and in November the third grade of the gymnasium were made.

Based on the emperor's decision and in accordance with the Foundation Act, Patronage and Board of Trustees were formed as the primary administrative bodies of the school, and they managed the school until 1920. According to the Foundation Act the school was a property of Serbian Orthodox Church in Novi Sad, and the Patronage administrated the school instead of it. At the head of the Patronage there were Metropolitan Bishop of Karlovci and Bishop of Novi Sad; two members were from Backa consistorium, and four from Orthodox Church Council in Novi Sad. The Patronage made decisions about the curriculum and the books which were used. It also chose principals and teachers, and regulated their salaries and awards. In act 7 of the Foundation Act the Board of Trustees was formed and its task was to invest the capital of the school and secures its continuous finances. The Board had six members, mainly rich merchants, craftsmen and lawyers.

The flag of the school was established in 1816. On one side is Lord Jesus Christ, and on the other Saint Sava. This flag has been preserved to this today, adorning the entrance to the school.

With the arrival of the teachers Georgije Magarašević, Mojsije Petrović, Ignjat Jovanović and Pavel Jozef Šafarik the number of the classes was increased to six, and at the beginning of October 1819 the Serbian Orthodox Great Gymnasium School in Novi Sad became a comprehensive gymnasium.

==== First school building ====
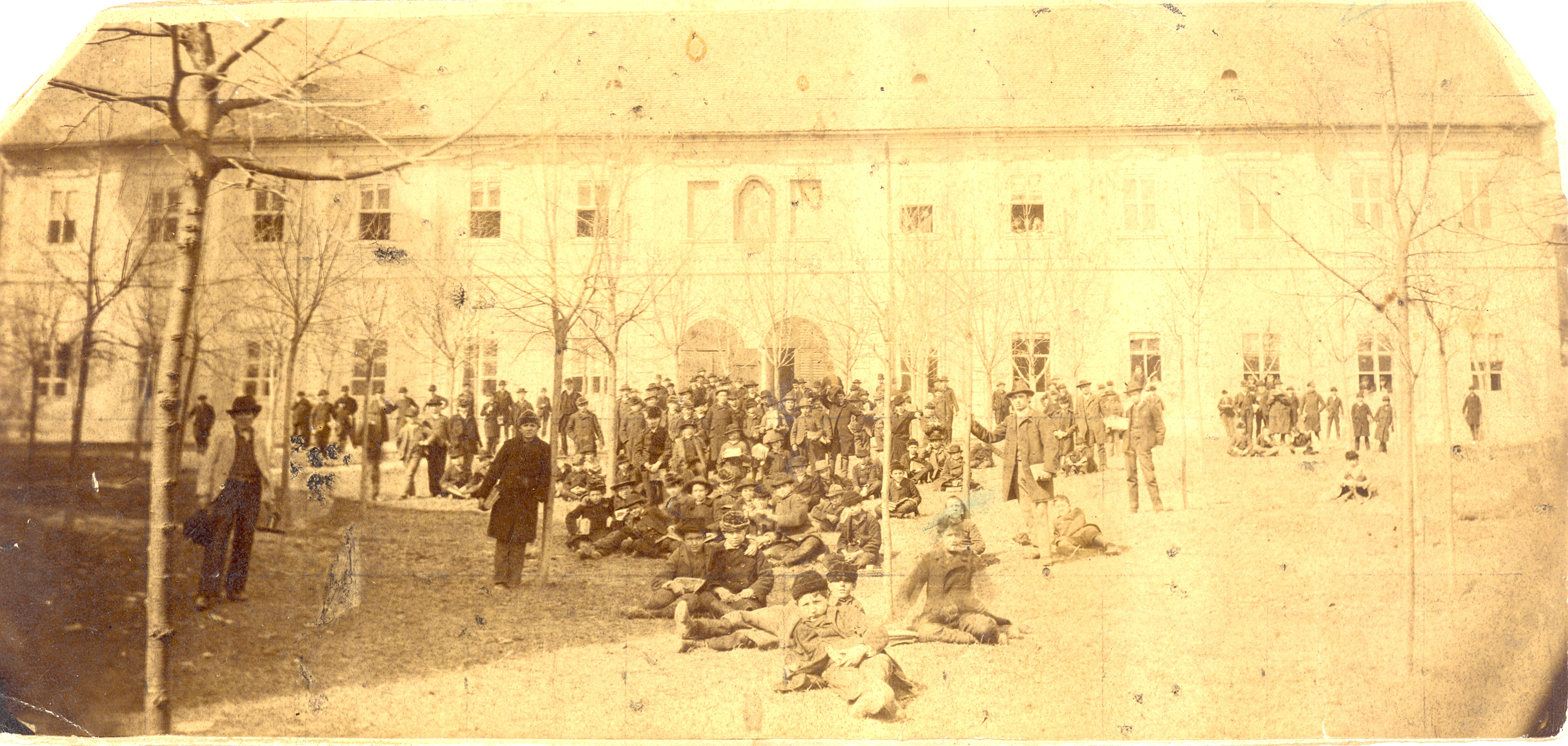
Serbian Orthodox Gymnasium, Novi Sad, 1889.

The first school building was at the corner of modern day Nikole Pašića and Zlatne grede streets, at the spot of today's Platoneum building next to the Orthodox Cathedral Church of Saint George. It was built by the council of Serbian Orthodox Church in 1788 for the needs of Latino-Slavic Nativity of the Mother of God School.

The first principals of the gymnasium were a priest Danilo Petrović and the mayor Grigorije Janković. With the increased number of students and classes the Patronage took steps to insure the emperor's accreditation for the school. This meant that all graduated students of the school had the right to enroll any academy, lycee and university in Habsburg Monarchy without taking entrance or differential examinations. This accreditation was given to the school by Francis II on 26 October 1818.

The curriculum was made in accordance with the state regulation "Ratio educationis" which was applied to all state schools in Hungary. The gymnasium had six classes until 1848, and all the subjects were taught in German, apart from religious lessons which were taught in Serbian. The following subjects were taught in the gymnasium: the basis of Latin and German, Geography, Anthropology and Arithmetic, Latin with syntax, Religious Lessons, Nature Studies and Anthropology, World's History, Archaeology, Physics, Logics, Rhetoric, Poetry and Ethics.

The school flourished when a literary historian and scientist Pavel Jozef Šafarik came to its head. In the period of 1816 to 1848 the school had seven principals, and the classes were taught by twenty-seven teachers. The best known among them were Milovan Vidaković, Pavel Jozef Šafarik, Georgije Magarasević i Jovan Hadžić.

Collecting books in order to make a school library started on Šafarik's great insistence in 1819. Ceremonial opening of the library was in 1822 and until 1849 it had about 1600 books.

Because of the importance of religious lessons, classes of church singing were held from the very beginning of the school. The first choir was founded in 1828. A first school of music was opened in the Serbian Grand Orthodox Gymnasium in 1841 and it was led by a conductor, composer and singer Aleksandar Morfidids-Nisis.

It is thought that in period between 1816 and 1848 more than 3 300 students attended the school which had enormous impact on intelligence and national rebirth of Serbs.

==== Second school building ====
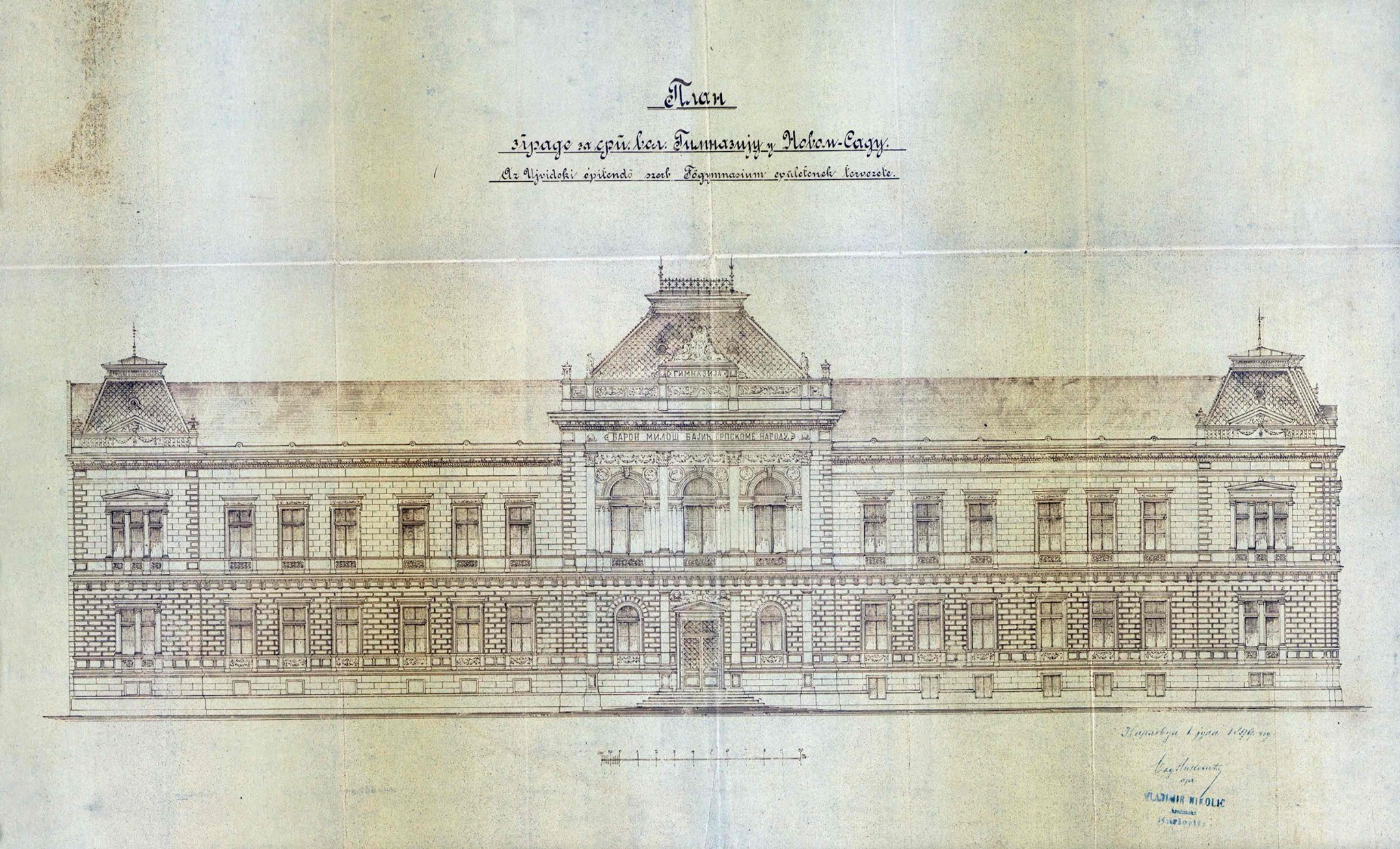
Architect Vladimir Nikolić's plan for Gymnasium Jovan Jovanović Zmaj in Novi Sad

The gymnasium continued its work up to the Hungarian Revolution of 1848. On June 12, 1849 Novi Sad was bombed from the Petrovaradin fortress. 2004 of 2812 buildings in the town were burnt down. Among them there was the gymnasium building. Beside the building all the didactical equipment and valuable collection for nature study were destroyed. The attempt to save the library was not successful because the books were moved to Almaš Orthodox Church (Church of the Tree Holy Hierarchs) which was also burnt down.

The revolution caused the school to pause its function until October 1852. Greatly impoverished the council of the Serbian Orthodox Church collected enough money to reopen the school. It was reopened as an incomplete four-class gymnasium which was not accredited. The curriculum at that time included the following subjects: History with Geography, Religious Lessons, Latin, Greek, German, Serbian and Arithmacy. The administration of four-class gymnasium was a great load for the Patronage and the council of the Orthodox Church in Novi Sad. The help unexpectedly came from Vienna from the Emperor Franz Joseph I of Austria personally. It came to Novi Sad on 27 September 1860 and included an offer to finance the school from the state funds and enable it to become a complete eight-class school, but on condition that it preserved its religious and national character. The offer was gladly accepted, but five years had passed before Hungarian regency council informed the Patronage that it was ordered by emperor's resolution to raise the school in Novi Sad to the level of a great gymnasium with eight classes. Emperor Franz Joseph I accredited the school with the same resolution.

At that time the school offered classical humanistic education, which was most evident in the number of classes dedicated to language studying. Back then, the following were the compulsory subjects: Latin, Religious Studies, Serbian, Hungarian, Geography, History, Natural Sciences, Physics, Geometrical Drawing, Philosophy and Calligraphy. The optional subjects included: French, Descriptive Geometry, Church Gospel Singing, Music and Singing (piano, violin, playing in orchestra and tambourine orchestra). In 1854 Dr. Đorđe Natošević, the then principal introduced gymnastics as a compulsory subject and equipped the school with several gymnastic devices. Until the new building for the school was erected, gymnastics classes had been run outside during summer. In 1865, the school's library restarted its function, when the Orthodox Church Municipality of Novi Sad assumed the responsibility to regularly finance its work. Invaluably important sources for the study of the school's history are the yearbooks that have been published since 1867. In the school year of 1867/1868 the first GCSE exams were held in the school. This event was of great importance since it was the first time that GCSE exams were organized for Serbian education. Since then the school managed to organize the GCSE exams every year, leading it to hold a leading position in the Serbian educational system.

As it was decided by the Patriarch Josif Rajačić, all the Serbian schools in the Monarchy accepted Saint Sava as the patron saint of Serb schools and schoolchildren. On that day all the students along with their teachers attended a holy liturgy in the Orthodox Cathedral. The celebration continued in the premises of the school where Slavski kolač was broken by all in attendance and the official performance took place in the honor of the celebration.

The political separatism of that time that was taking place among the Serbian people also affected the school. It found itself in the middle of a conflict between the conservative clergy that governed the school's work via the Patronage and the Liberal party led by Svetozar Miletić that tried to take over the running of the school. In the period between 15 and 18 August 1866 the premises of the school were used as the whereabouts of the Foundation Assembly of The United Serbian Youth, the romantic revolutionary organization which fought for the liberation and unification of the Serbian people. Not uncommon were the conflicts between the Patronage and certain teachers and students, which largely diminished the reputation of the school.

After the Austro-Hungarian Compromise of 1867, a period of changes ensued in the school's work. Conditioning the state subventions the then Hungarian authorities made an attempt to implement the assimilation policies. In the school year of 1870/71 the Hungarian Assembly approved the funds of 8000 forints to help the school, provided that the Ministry of Education had the right to choose the curriculum and the teachers. The Patronage refused this subsidy claiming that it was in contradiction with the School Foundation Act. The school was successfully run during this period by Vasa Pušibrk (who was the school's principal from 1871 till 1910).

After the Basic Secondary Education Act was implemented in 1883, even greater challenges ensued regarding the preservation of the school's inner autonomy. Since then the Patronage was under direct supervision of the representatives of the Hungarian government, who carried out inspection twice a year and observed the final exams. According to the Secondary Education Act from 1883 the school management was obliged to considerably adjust the work and organization to the state schools, which required even higher subsidies.

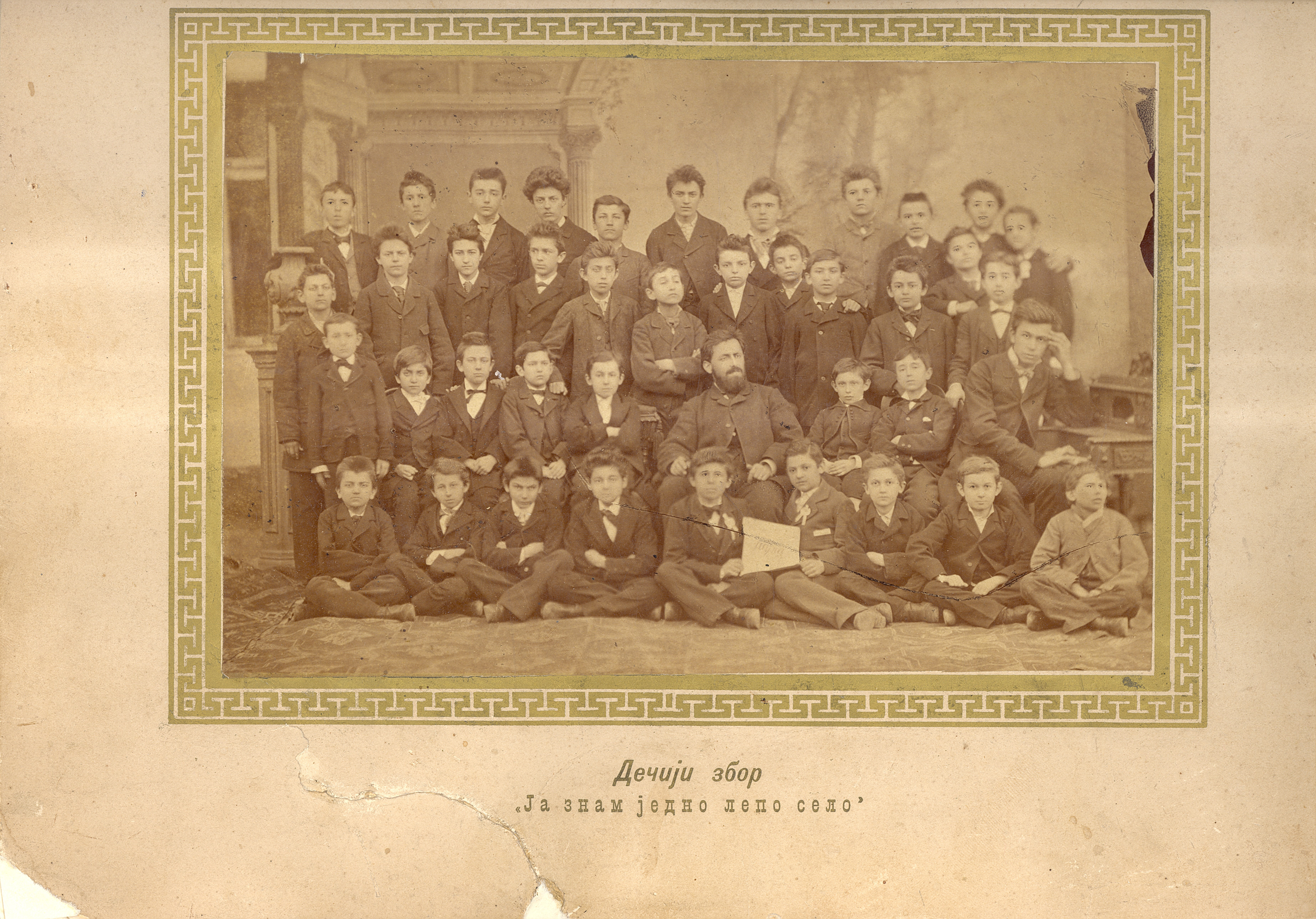
Jovan Grčić Student Choir, Novi Sad, 1890.

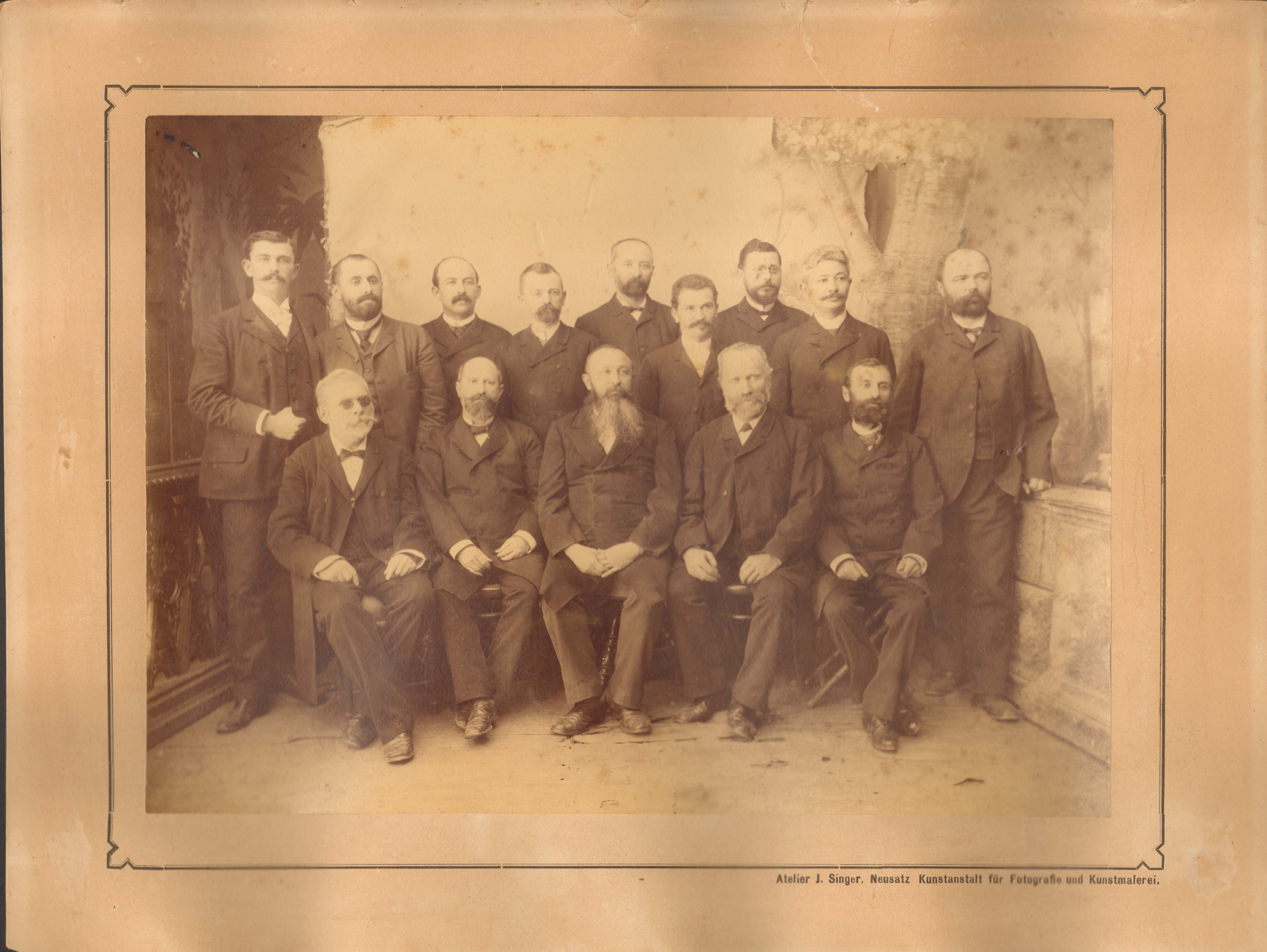
Collegium of Professors of the Serbian Grand Orthodox Gymnasium, Novi Sad, 1891.

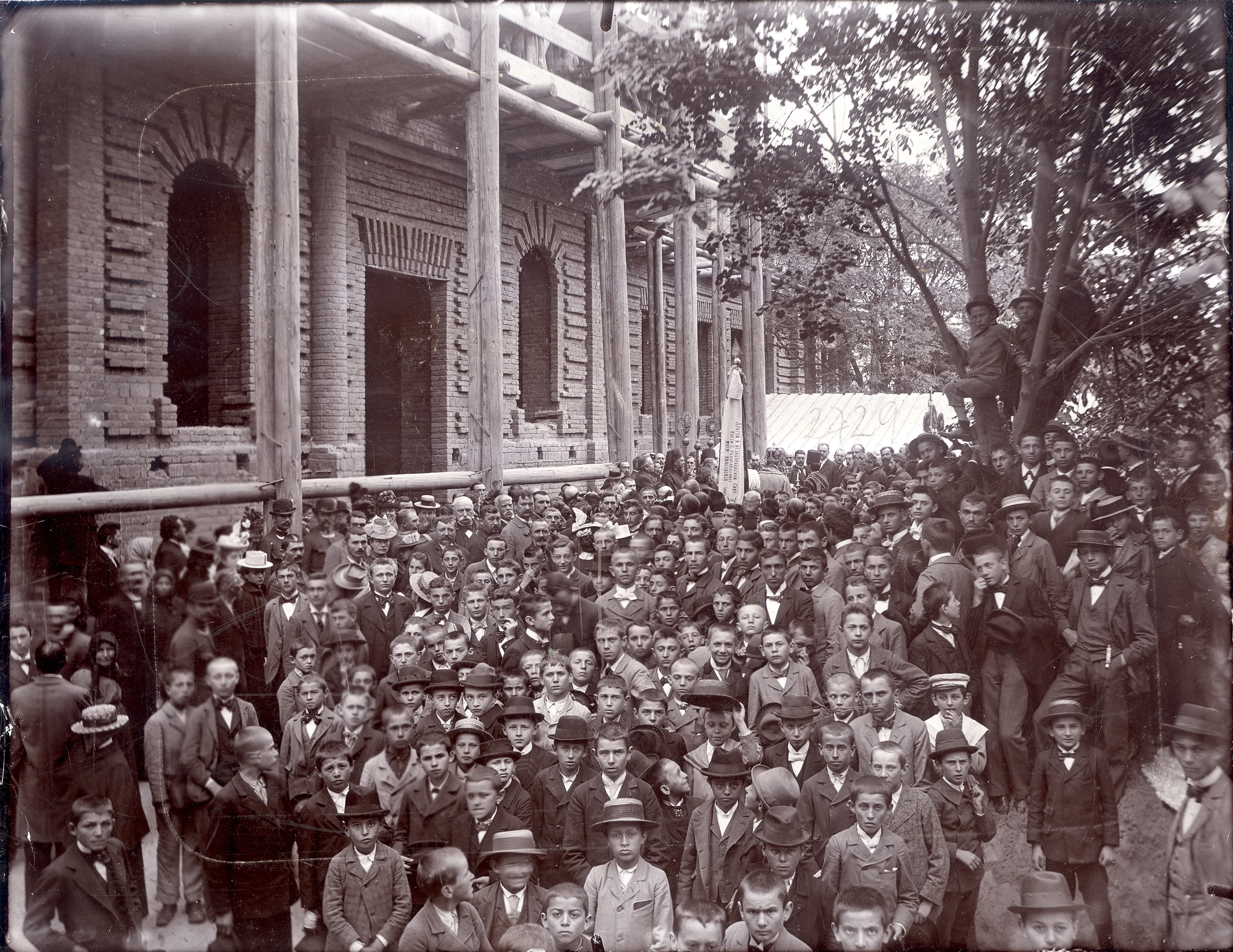
Consecration of the new building of the Serbian Grand Orthodox Gymnasium, Novi Sad, 1901.

Apart from the school's fund, the school lived off school's activities and endowments and donations of many of national benefactors, such as: the endowment of Atanasije Gereski, the so-called Atanaseum, Dr. Nikola Krstić from Belgrade, Gedeon Dunđerski, Pajević couple from Novi Sad, Teodor and Persida Mandić, Luka Milanović, Marija Petrović, Vasa Jovanović Čiča, the endowment of Đorđe Servijski and many others.

During the 1870s the school's premises were no longer sufficient for the school's needs. The Board for Collecting Donations for the extension of the school's premises started with the work in 1897. During this activity, Baron Miloš Bajić (the grandson of Miloš Obrenović) donated 200 000 krones for the construction. The new building was constructed in the Renaissance Revival style where the old one had stood according to the design by Vladimir Nikolić. The construction started on 22 September 1899 and finished on 1 July 1900.

According to the 1899/1900 curriculum, the compulsory subjects were: Religious Sciences, Latin, Greek, Hungarian, German, Serbian, Geography, History, Natural Sciences, Physics, Mathematics, Geometrical Drawing, Philosophy and Calligraphy, while the optional subjects included: French, Shorthand, Instrument Playing (the violin, piano, tambourine, fencing, Octoechos and Religious Science for the Roman Catholics, Protestants and Jews).

The activity of the students was particularly evident in starting numerous student newspapers. In the 19th century these included: "Sloga", "Đački Venac", "Zolja" and "Đačka Matica". In the beginning of the 20th century these were: "Sova", "Gusle", "Šestoškolac", "Bič", "Osvitak", "Napredak" and "Novi đački venac".

The school had 15,792 students enrolled in the period between 1868 and 1918. The first high school girls were enrolled in the school during the school year of 1894/1895. Most of the students were of the Serbian nationality, but there were also Germans, Jews, Croats, Hungarians, Slovaks, Romanians and Ruthenians. Unlike in other gymnasiums in Hungary, the Patronage decided to set the same school fee for all the students irrespective of their religious orientation and to approve the fee exemption for the students who’d deserve it by their hard work.

Throughout the entire 19th century the school was a real center of intellectual activity. Either as students or as teachers the following great people took part in the school's activity: Jovan Đorđević, Laza Kostić, Jovan Turoman, Đura Daničić, Jovan Jovanović Zmaj, Ilaja Ognjanović-Abukazem, Milorad Popović Šapčanin, Jovan Grčić-Milenko, Paja Marković-Adamov, Milan Savić, Svetozar Miletić, Mihailo Polit-Desančić, Tihomir Ostojić, Isidor Bajić, Stanije Stanojević, Jovan Radonić, Radovan Košutić, Milan Šević, Pavle Vujević, Aleksa Ivić, Radivoj Kašanin, Radivoj Petrović, Jovan Maksimović, Mileta Jakšić, Miloje Milojević, Petar Konjović, and many others.

=== 20th century ===
Due to its vicinity to the battlefield of the Great War, the school's premises were taken over by the Austro-Hungarian army in 1914 and in 1915 it was turned into a military hospital. The teaching staff was scarce on the account of mobilization and other war effects and in the school years 1914/1915 and 1915/1916 only the exams were organized in the school. During the school years 1916/1917 and 1917/1918 regular classes and teaching was carried out but with a lot of difficulties due to the lack of both teachers and money. Therefore, the school years were shortened and semester exams were introduced.

After the war, the school continued its work in the liberated and newly united Kingdom of the Serbs, Croats and Slovenes. The school year 1919/1920 started with no significant innovations. The school was still run by the Patronage until 27 August 1920, when the Ministry of Education of the Kingdom of the Serbs, Croats and Slovenes made a decision that would bring the school into the state's possession and give it the name the State Men's Gymnasium in Novi Sad. As it was generally thought, there was no need for the school to continue its work as a private confessional school. This decision came at just the right time, since due to the war-ruined economy, inflation and agrarian reform, the Patronage could no longer cope with economic hardships and finance the school's work on its own. This however didn’t end the work of the Patronage, as it continued to manage the funds and property of the school.

The first and foremost task was renewal of the classrooms, library and school's inventory, since the school's premises were turned into a hospital during the war. After the First World War, the library was particularly damaged, with 2/3 of the students’ books and about 2500 of the books from the teachers’ library were lost. The library would reopen and continue its services in 1927.

The national liberation and newly created circumstances were most evident in the school curricula. In history classes the emphasis was put on studying the history of the Serbs, Croats and Slovenes, while the Serbian language and mathematics held the leading position by the number of their classes in week. As an expression of the general Francophilia, there came to the increase in the number of classes where French was taught and studied. Regarding the tradition and efforts made by certain teachers, German was taught pretty extensively. There was a strong rivalry between the German and French teachers.

In the period between 1935 and 1937, a three-hectare sports ground for physical education classes was built, on the grounds of present-day FC Index in the Liman neighborhood. Volleyball courts, basketball courts, football fields, tennis courts and gyms were built there. In 1914 the students of this school founded the FC Vojvodina and doing that they laid the foundation of the sports society, which today is one of the biggest in Europe.

In the new country the school developed a very active social culture. Lectures were held, students’ meetings and activities were organized. The highest state officials visited it very often because the school was highly respected due to its historical significance.

When the gymnasiums of Novi Sad and Karlovci became state schools Serbian nation was left without the classical gymnasium. The minister of education Anton Korošec tried to turn back the time when he gave the permission for the renewal of Serbian Grand Orthodox Gymnasium of Novi Sad in September 1939. The old gymnasium became a subtenant in its own former building. In 1939 this school had one class and in 1940 the second one was opened. The attempt to renew the old gymnasium was stopped by the outbreak of the Second World War.

The dynamic development of The State Men's Real Gymnasium of King Alexander I was stopped by the April war in 1941. The fast crash of the Yugoslav army was a terrible sign of the great suffering of the Serbian nation which followed. The fascist occupying forces entered Novi Sad on 13 April 1941. The school's work was prohibited as it was an institution with an emphasized national significance. A new Hungarian Royal State School with Serbian as a teaching language was founded on the site of the old school. It had two parallel classes in each grade. The aim of this educational institution was to develop the sense of loyalty to Great Hungary and to make the preconditions for the process of magyarization through the lessons of Hungarian language and history. The basic subject was Hungarian language and the classes were held in Serbian. The teachers had to speak Hungarian among themselves.

Denationalization and magyarization were obvious not only in the classes and extracurricular activities but also in the changes of some subjects. The study of national history was put out of the curriculum and the study of Hungarian history was introduced.

During the war the school library was seriously destroyed. The aggressor decided that the school library can hold only the samples of the books printed before the decline of the Austro-Hungarian Empire i.e. before the creation of the Kingdom of the Serbs, Croatians and Slovenians. The patronage got 11,050 books to keep and over 20,000 disappeared. After the Second World War the books were given to the library of Matica srpska to be kept there.

During the difficult days of occupation the people were expelled and killed on a massive scale (the Novi Sad raid in 1942) and all the suffering finished in October 1944. It is supposed that about 213 students and teachers of the school lost their lives during the war.

After the war, three real gymnasiums were founded in Novi Sad on 28 February 1945: Male (which was previously on the spot of Platoneum and was later moved to the building in Futoška Street), Mixed (on the former spot of Isidor Bajić Secondary School of Music) and Female (in the building of the previous Civil school). After Bulgarian army had moved out of the school's building, the Mixed School moved in on the 30 June 1945.

The Patronage carried on helping the school's development all until the communist authorities took away the property of the Orthodox Municipality of Novi Sad and funds of the Patronage by the Nationalization Act from 5 December 1946 and its Annex from 28 April 1948. By this act the rights of the Patronage over the school were abolished.

After the liberation of the country, because of the large-scale poverty and the lack of basic didactic device, the classes were held with the great dedication of the teachers. The lack of course books and professional teaching staff as well as classes with the great number of students represented one more difficulty of that time.

After the Second World War, the new Yugoslavia was formed under communist ideology, which resulted in the whole educational process focusing on the social-political education on the basis of Marxist study. Until the conflict with Inform biro in 1947 Yugoslav Government blindly copied USSR's social system, which had negative effects on the education-"the reduction of criteria and leveling in work demands with higher elementary school children and secondary school children." The church was severely criticized by the Communist regime so that religious education was put out of the curriculum for the first time since the school's foundation.

The period from the end of the World War II until the decline of Socialist Yugoslavia has seen many reforms in the education. The high school has been used by education authorities as an indicator of success of certain reforms, showing its reputation in the new socialist society.

According to the General Education Act from 1958, the school had to give its students the profound knowledge in science and humanities and general-technical knowledge. The innovation was that teaching was divided into general and optional. General teaching involved: Serbo-Croatian and literature, history, sociology with the basics of political-economics, Yugoslav social system, logic and psychology, philosophy, art, foreign language (besides Russian which was dominant after the liberation, English, German and French were introduced), biology, chemistry, physics, mathematics, crafts, physical education and pre-military training.

Optional teaching was divided into four departments: social (social science and the second foreign language), natural sciences first group (mathematics, chemistry, physics), natural sciences second group (biology, physics, chemistry) and foreign language (second foreign language and Latin). The aim of this kind of teaching was to make a basis for further specialized training and to create a socialist point of view to the world. On the basis of this federal law, National Republic of Serbia decided that the gymnasiums in Serbia should be divided into two departments: social and natural science.

After a great school reform initiated by Stipe Šuvar, from 1977 until 1983, the school worked as a Centre for the education of staff in social activities. It was used to taught future professionals in law, mathematics, IT, biology, physics, chemistry and geography.

The decline of the country, economic and political isolation caused not only the reconsideration of the values in society but also a crisis of the country′s educational system. Besides this, the school managed to preserve its reputation, especially with the opening of the special mathematical classes for gifted students.

=== 21st century ===
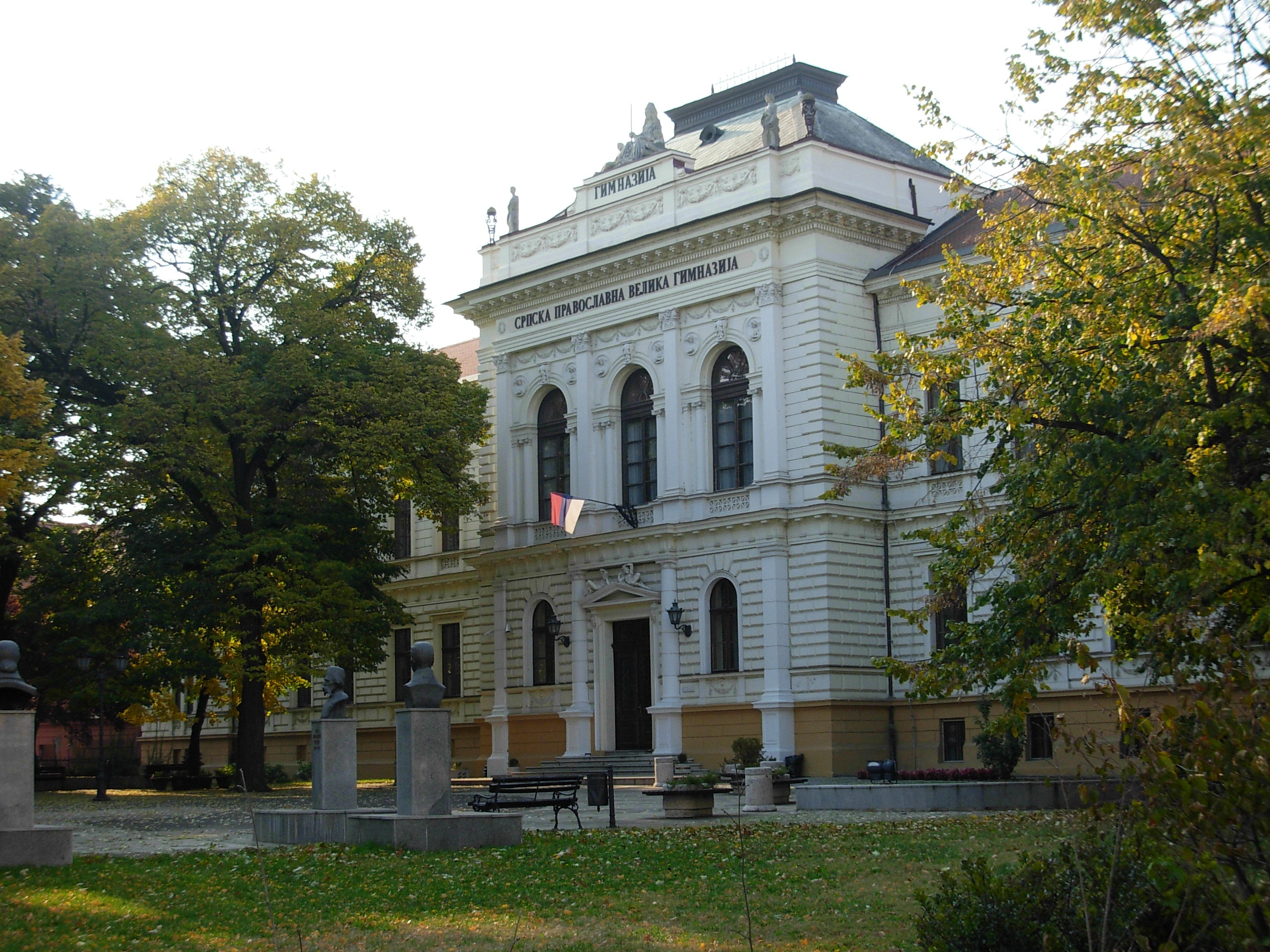
Gymnasium building before the 2016 renovations.

After the democratic changes on 5 October 2000, the development of the school went into two directions: not only did the school become the leader in introducing innovations and higher standards in secondary education but it also returned to its traditions. There are six departments at school today: natural sciences department, bilingual department, department for mathematically gifted students, department for gifted students in area of computers, department for gifted students in area of physics and general-sports department. Since 2007 there have been experimental classes of the last two primary school grades (7th and 8th grade). The first official class of 7th and 8th grade is class of 2001 (it officially started in 2016). The school is equipped with three modern IT study rooms and specialized rooms for mathematics, physics, chemistry and biology with the laboratories, school library with 30 000 books, stateroom and gym. There are extracurricular activities like choir and orchestra, French drama group, reciting group, eco club, debate club, editorial staff of the school newspaper "Skamija" (founded in 1972), linguistic workshop, psychology workshop, chemistry and biology workshop, art workshop and IT and robotics workshop. For years the cultural exchange of teachers and students has been realized with a High School from Slaný (Czech Republic), and from this year the same form of exchange will start with the High School from Moscow called "Elada".

In 2016, the gymnasium building was extensively renovated. Besides restoring damaged sections of the interior and exterior structure, the buildings main roof has been altered to accommodate a glass roof for the school museum in the style and place of the old main roof. The building changed its color from white to a vibrant beige color with lighter beige and white highlights in key areas of the masonry and relief. The new color of the building was inspired by the colors of other historical buildings of Novi Sad and surrounding areas.

== Study streams ==
In this school there are several study streams:

- Science and Mathematics (chemistry, math, physics, biology); 1 class
- Bilingual Science and Mathematics (chemistry, math, physics, biology); Bilingual Serbian-English, Serbian-French, Serbian-German and Serbian-Russian; since 2010; 2 classes
- Sports Science and Mathematics (athletes); since 2015; 1 class
- Specialist in Mathematics (for gifted students - Math and Computer Science); 2 classes
- Specialist in Computers (for gifted students - Computer Science, Programming, Mathematics); 3 classes
- Specialist in Physics (for gifted students - Physics, Mechanics, Quantum physics); 1 class
- Specialist in Chemistry and Biology (for gifted students - Chemistry, Biology, Biochemistry, Organic Chemistry); since 2019; 1 class
- Elementary Specialist in Mathematics (for gifted 7th and 8th grade elementary students - Math and Computer Science); since 2007; 1 class
- Elementary Specialist in Computers (for gifted 7th and 8th grade elementary students - Computer Science, Programming, Mathematics); since 2007; 1 class
- Elementary Specialist in Physics (for gifted 7th and 8th grade elementary students - Physics, Mechanics, Quantum physics); since 2007; 1 class

=== Specialist study streams for elementary students ===
Since September 2007, the school has held specialty study streams for gifted 7th and 8th grade elementary students for Mathematics, Physics, and Computers, the only school in Vojvodina province that does this.

Part of the gymnasium collegium consists of professors and assistants from the faculties of the University of Novi Sad.

=== Bilingual study streams ===
Since September 2010, the school has held bilingual study streams. Bilingual study stream exists in English, French, German, and Russian. The study stream is Science and Mathematics, but math, physics, chemistry, computers, and biology are studied in foreign languages. The rest of the classes are studied in Serbian.

Application exams for bilingual study streams occur 3 weeks before the regular school application exam (which every student is required to pass). For French, DELF A2 level is required. This class was founded by the French Embassy, which follows the education of these students throughout the 4 years. After 4 years, students that pass the French bilingual study stream are given a French language diploma and the right to study in France, without the need to take further language differences tests, as well as a chance for student stipend in France. French study stream students travel to France every year, to test their knowledge of the French language.

=== Sports study stream ===
Since 2015, the school has held a Science and Mathematics study stream specific for sports students. These future athletes often have training and competitions during regular school year, and have the school curriculum adjusted for their specific sports.

== Principals ==
1810–1920

- Danilo Petrović and Grigorije Janković, until 1819
- Pavel Jozef Šafárik, 1819–1826
- Jeftimije Jovanović, 1826–1827
- Danilo Petrović, 1827–1828
- Dr Jovan Hadžić, 1830–1849
- Dr Đorđe Natošević, 1853–1857
- Pavle Jovanović, 1857–1858
- Petar Ninković, 1858–1865
- Konstantin Isaković, 1865–1866
- Aleksandar Gavrilović, 1866–1867
- German Anđelić, 1867–1868
- Aleksandar Gavrilović, 1868–1871
- Vasa Pušibrk, 1871–1910
- Stevan Milovanov, 1918–1920

1920–1941

- Marko Vilić, 1920
- Dimitrije Šilić, 1920–1922
- Vasa Danilović, 1922–1925
- Jovan Živojinović, 1925–1926
- Aleksandar Zamurović, 1926–1927
- Mirko Balubdžić, 1927–1932
- Miraš Kićović, 1932–1933
- Milan Jakovljević, 1933
- Dušan Jovanov, 1933–1934
- Dr Branko Magarašević, 1934–1941

1941–1944

- Ferenc Medgyessy, 1941
- Kálmán Váradi, 1941–1944

1945–present

- Milenko Šuvaković, 1945–1959
- Petar Adamović, 1945–1947
- Marije Hvala, 1947–1948
- Živan Radmanović, 1948–1949
- Novak Radović, 1959–1965
- Sloboda Maslać, 1965–1967
- Dr Đorđe Bajić, 1967–1977
- Vera Banić-Carić, 1977–1980
- Marko Cicmil, 1980–2001
- Petar Kojić, 2001–2002
- Dr Radivoje Petrov Stojković, 2002–2026
- Katarina Kovačević (acting), 2026–
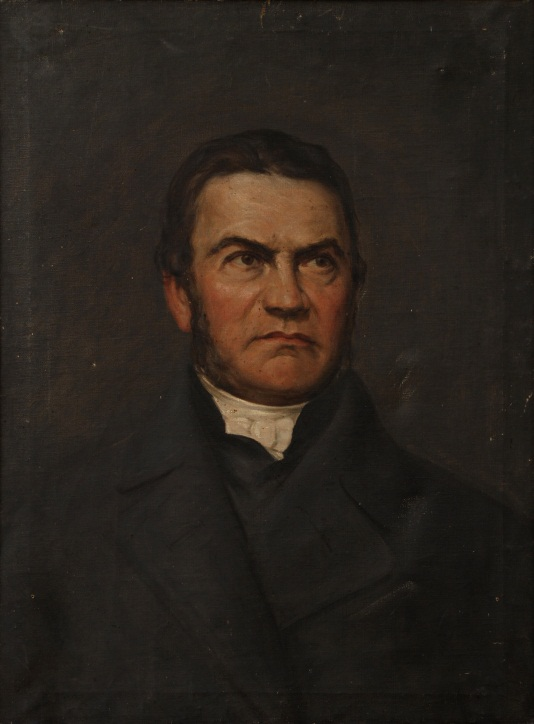
Pavel Jozef Šafárik,
1819–1826

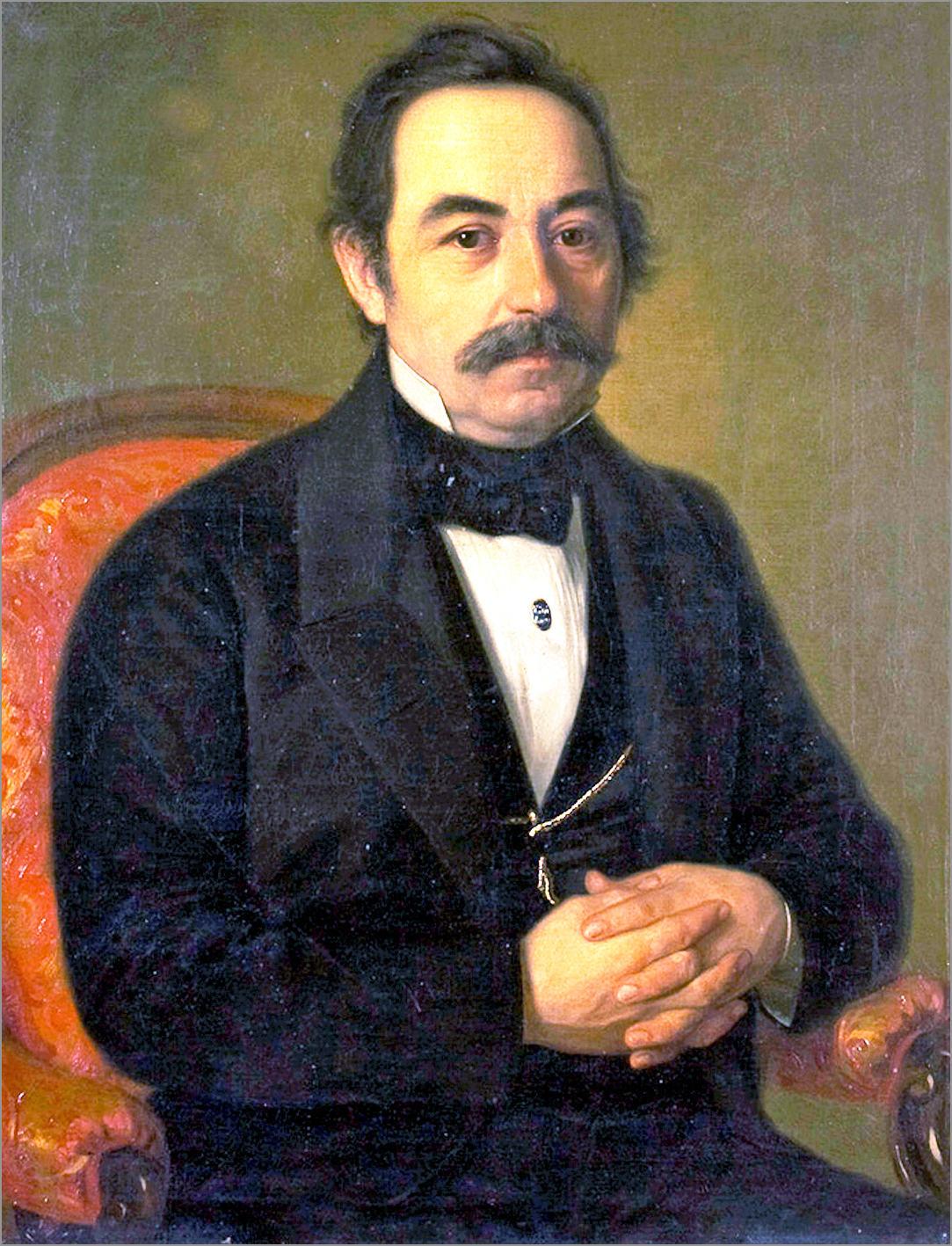
Dr Jovan Hadžić,
1830–1849

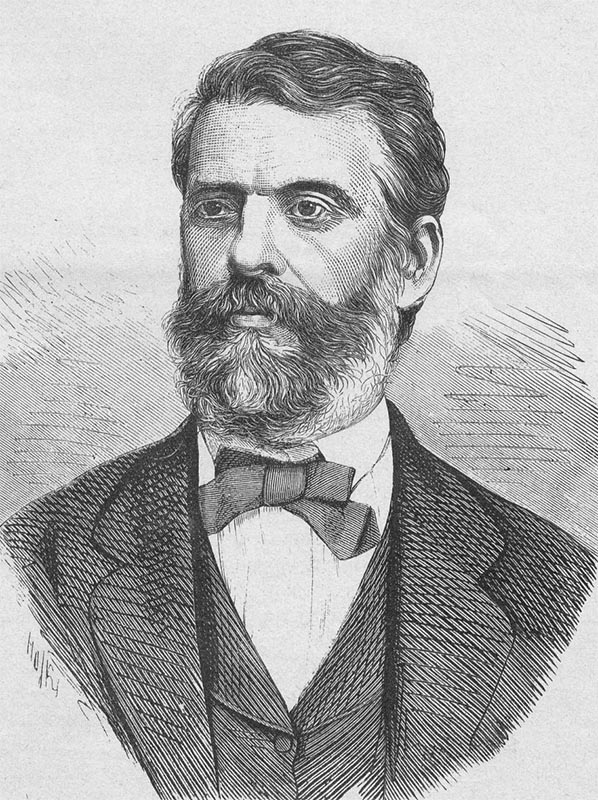
Dr Đorđe Natošević,
1853–1857

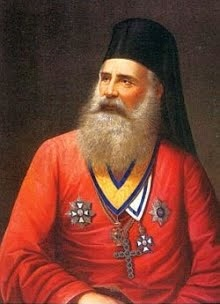
German Anđelić,
1867–1868

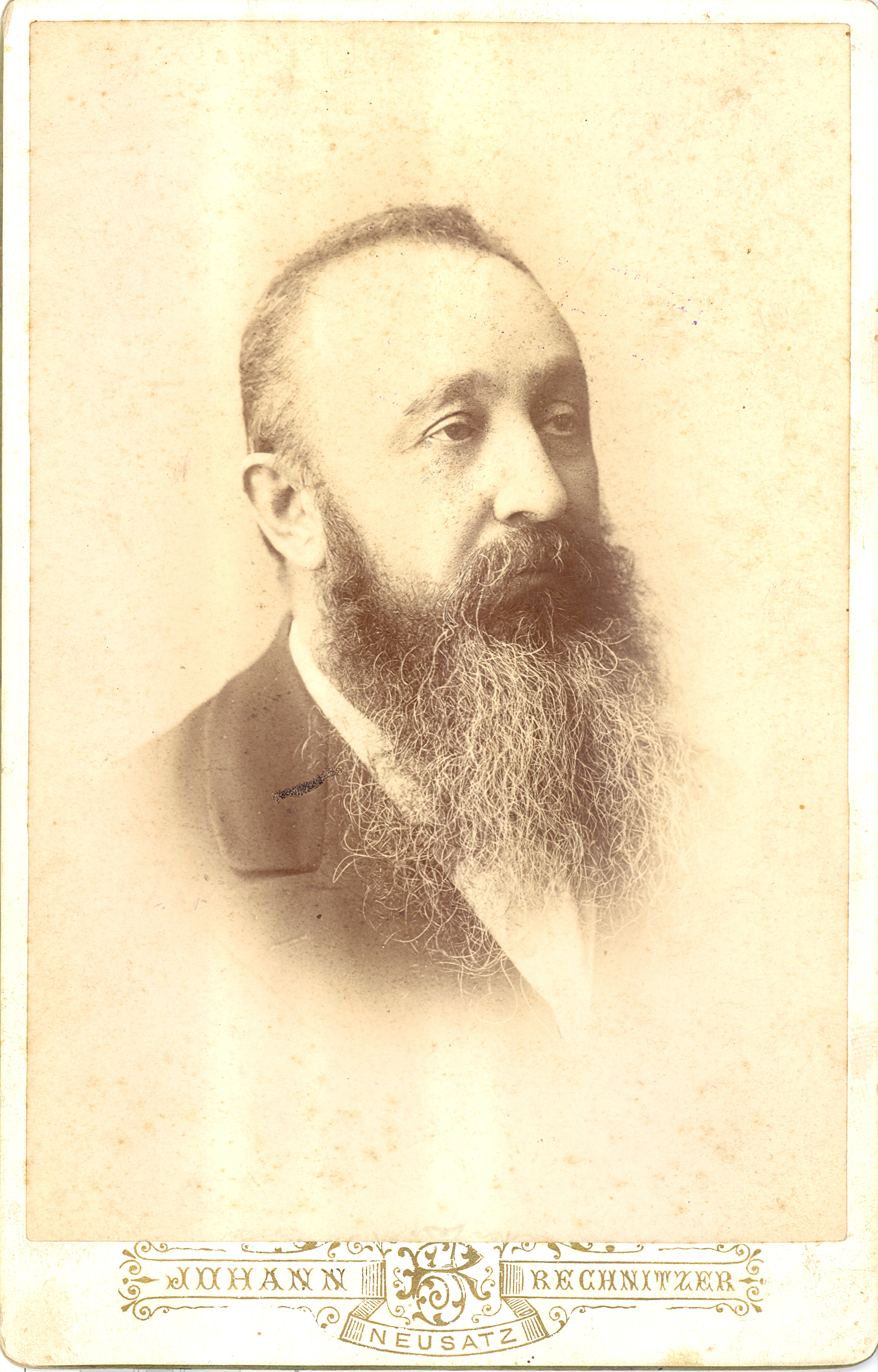
Vasa Pušibrk,
1871–1910

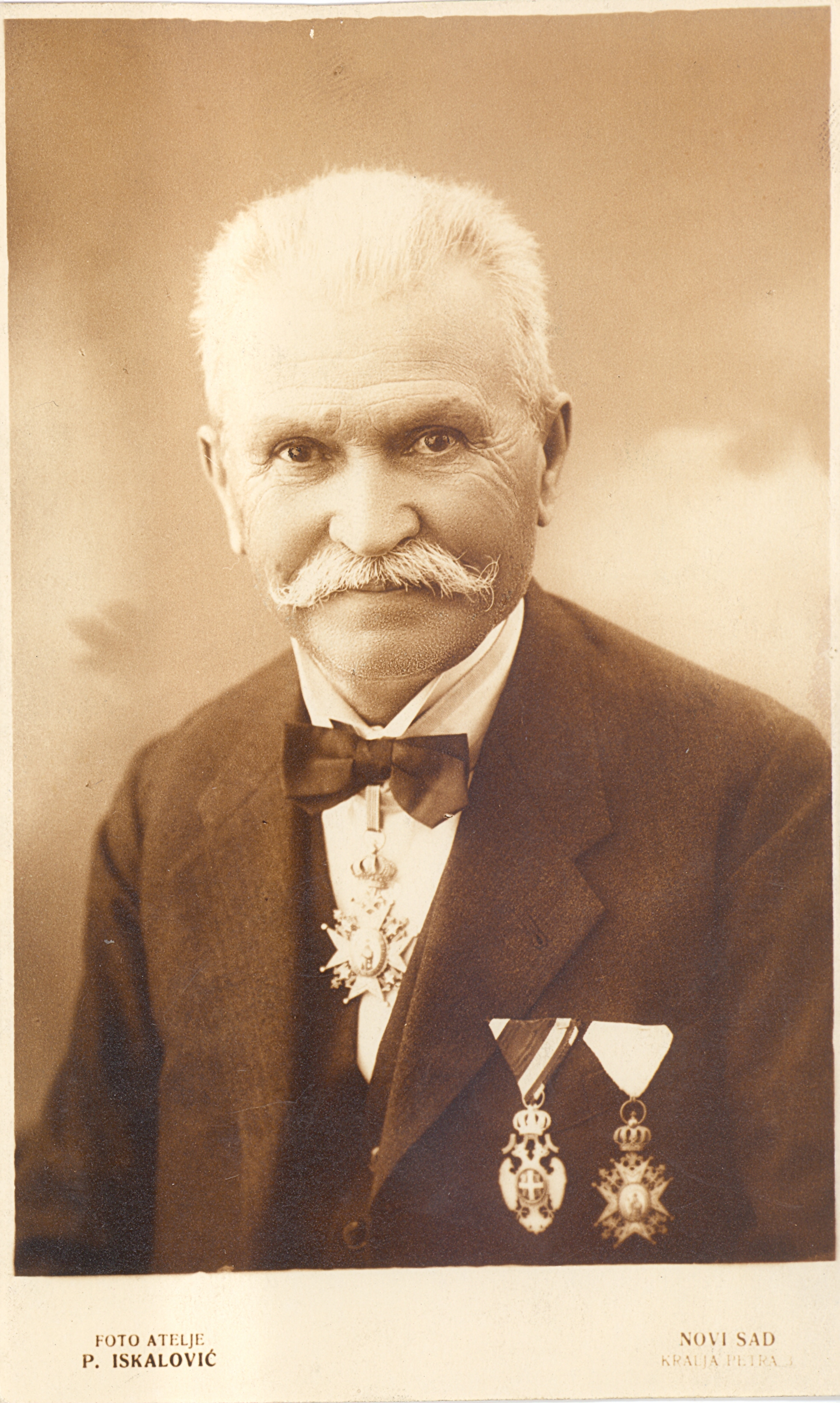
Stevan Milovanov,
1918–1920

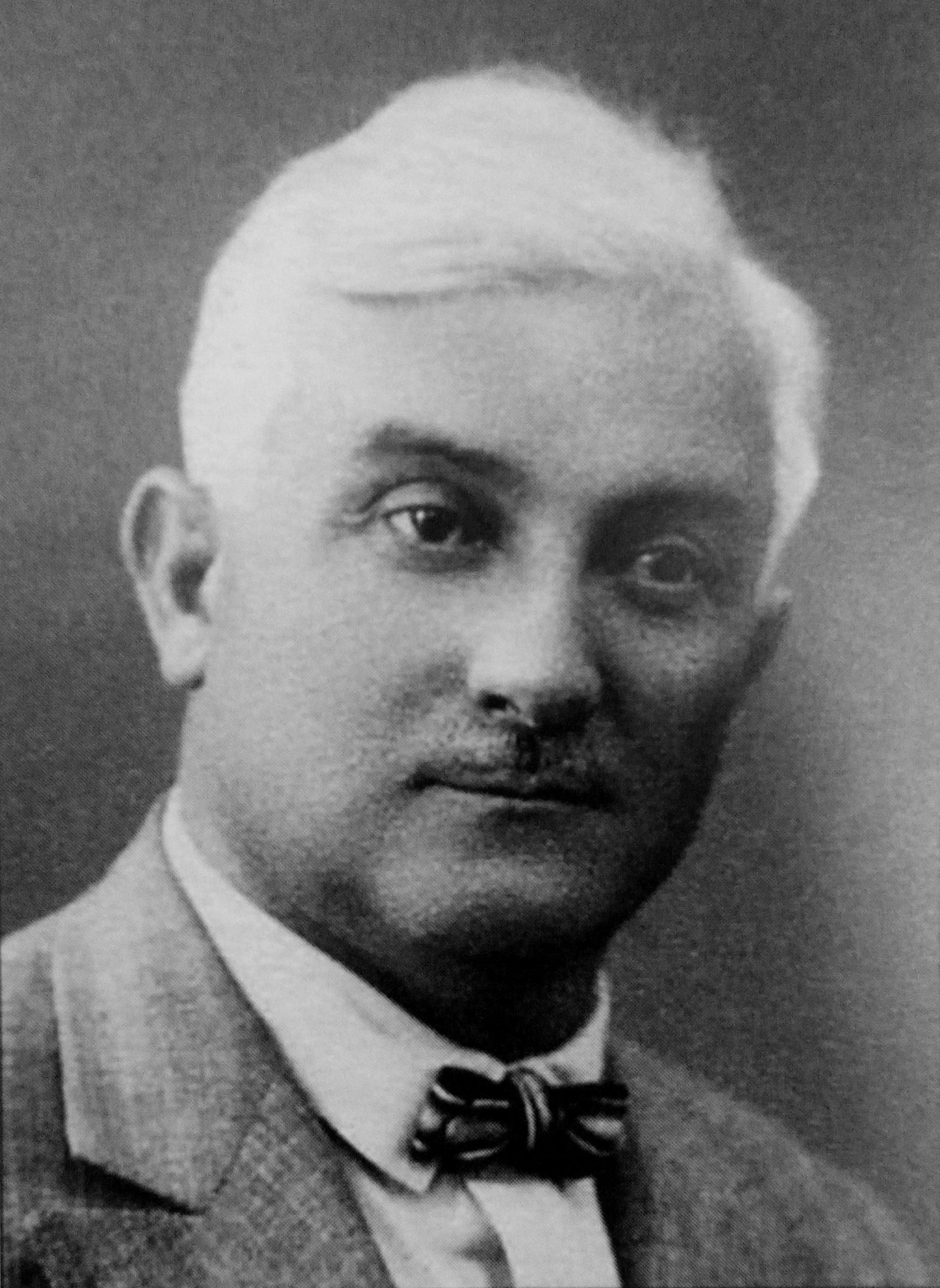
Milan Jakovljević,
1933

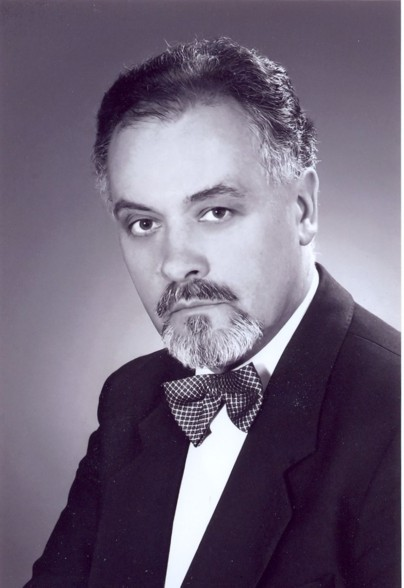
Petar Kojić,
2001–2002

== Accolades ==
Throughout its history, the school gained several medals and awards for its services and results in education.

=== Medals ===
- Order of Saint Sava 1st Grade of the Kingdom of Yugoslavia, 1935
- Order of Merit for the People 1st Grade of the FNR Yugoslavia, 1960
- Order of Work with the Red Flag of SFR Yugoslavia, 1985
- Order of Saint Sava 1st Grade of the Serbian Orthodox Church, in 2016

=== Awards ===
- Vukova Award of the Cultural and Educational Community of Serbia, 1970
- November Award of the Alliance of Physical Culture Organisations of Serbia, 1971
- Spartakova Award, 1972.
- Punoletstva Award, 25 May 1972.
- Vojvodina Liberation Award, 1985
- Novi Sad's October Award, 1984
- Gold plaque for education "Biramo najbolje u 2002."
- Svetosavska Award to the best secondary school for results achieved in 2002/2003 school year of the Ministry of Education of the Republic of Serbia
- International award for excellence in services & products, 2005
- Recognition of "Dr Djordje Natosević" for outstanding results in education and training work 2005/2006 school year

== Notable alumni ==
- Boško Petrović, novelist and poet
- Đorđe Balašević, music artist
- Đuro Daničić, philologist
- Dušan Kanazir, molecular biologist
- Dušan Makavejev, director
- Isidor Bajić, music composer
- Josif Tatić, actor
- Jovan Grčić Milenko, poet and physician
- Jovan Soldatović, sculptor
- Jovan Jovanović Zmaj, poet
- Laza Kostić, poet and translator
- Lazar Paču, minister of finance
- Maja Gojković, mayor of Novi Sad
- Milan Savić, physician, writer, and polymath
- Olga Hadžić, mathematician
- Pavel Jozef Šafárik, philologist
- Petar Kralj, actor
- Porfirije, Serbian Patriarch
- Rudolf Brucci, music composer
- Sergej Milinković-Savić, football player
- Svetozar Miletić, mayor of Novi Sad
- Vasa Stajić, writer and philosopher
