= Chapel of Peace, Sremski Karlovci =

Church in Vojvodina, Serbia

Chapel of Peace
- Капела мира Kapela mira
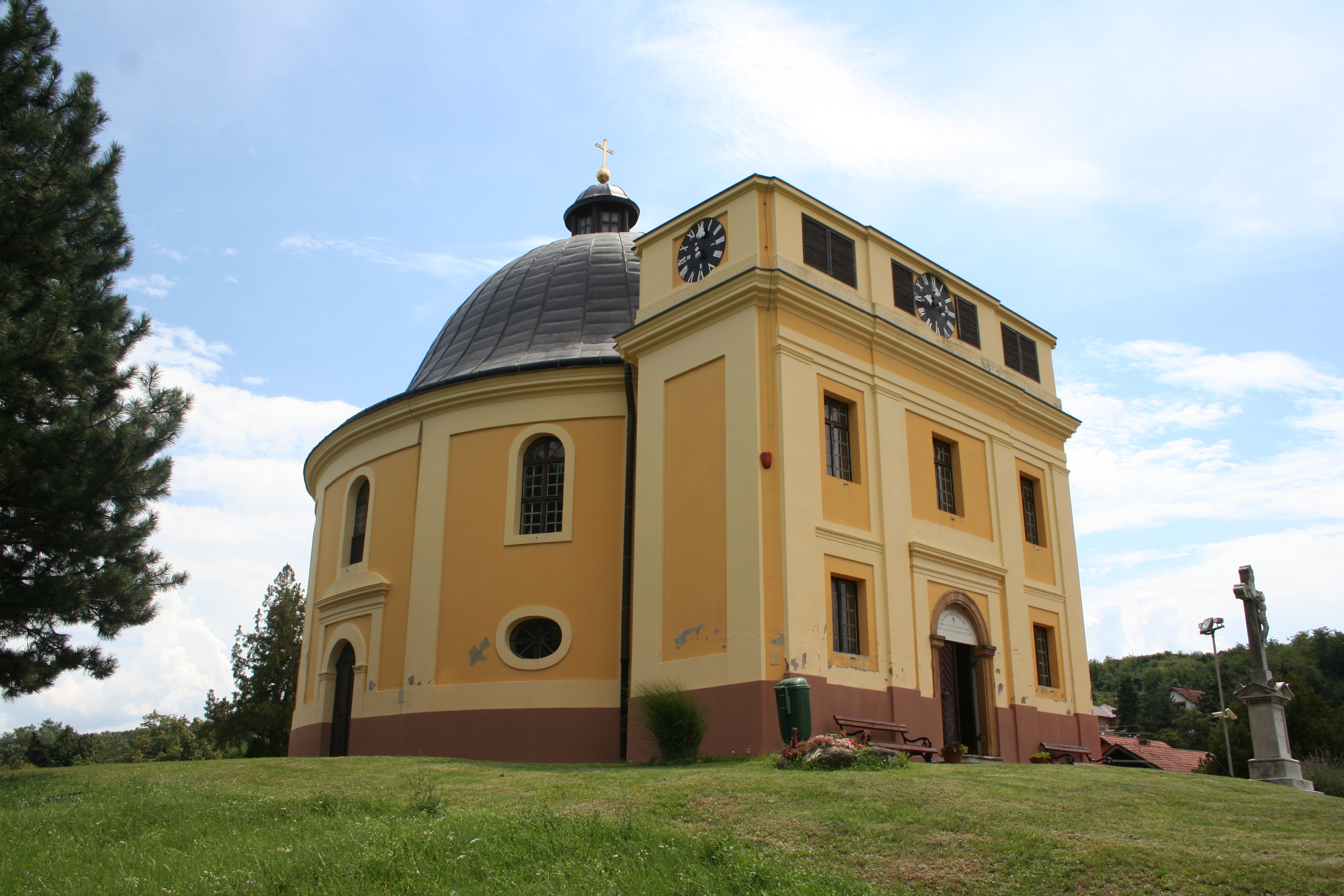
- Chapel of Peace
- Chapel of Peace
- 45°11′51″N 19°56′27″E
- Location: Sremski Karlovci, Vojvodina

Cultural Heritage of Serbia
- Type: Immovable Cultural Heritage of Exceptional Importance
- Designated: 1993
- Reference no.: ZM 26
- Country: Serbia
- Denomination: Roman Catholic

History
- Dedication: Virgin Mary

Architecture
- Style: Neoclassicism
- Years built: 1817

Administration
- Archdiocese: Roman Catholic Diocese of Srijem

The Chapel of Peace (Serbo-Croatian: Капела мира, Kapela mira) is a Roman Catholic chapel in Sremski Karlovci in Vojvodina, Serbia, built in 1817 at the site of the signing of the 1699 Treaty of Karlowitz which concluded the Great Turkish War. The building was constructed as a token of gratitude to the Virgin Mary for aiding the Christian forces in securing a favourable outcome in the war. Designed to resemble an Ottoman military tent, the chapel has a circular base and three entrances, symbolizing the passageways used by the representatives of Venice, Austria, and Poland. The fourth entrance, meant for the Ottoman delegation, was sealed upon completion, reflecting the hope that they would never return to Pannonian Basin.

== History ==
In 1699 Treaty of Karlowitz, mediated by Netherlands and Kingdom of England, was signed between the Ottoman Empire and the Holy League of Tsardom of Russia, Venice, Austria and Poland at the site of the chapel. The historical event overlapped with related Great Migrations of the Serbs after which the town will become cultural, religious and political centre at least until the Serbian Revolution. The peace negotiations were held on neutral ground that belonged to neither side. Since the town was unable to accommodate the large delegations and their entourages, tents were set up outside the city, with a central wooden council chamber built on a circular foundation. To resolve disputes over who would enter first, the council chamber was designed with four entrances. This marked the first recorded use of a round table in diplomatic practice. In 1710, Franciscan monks, with imperial approval, built a small round wooden chapel on the site, known as the Chapel of Our Lady of Peace, which stood until 1808.

The chapel's current appearance was shaped by a decision of the Hofkriegsrat in 1810. The foundation stone was laid the same year, and construction of the building itself, excluding the interior, was completed in 1814. The final interior decoration was finished in 1817. One of the donors was Stefan Stratimirović, the Metropolitan of the Metropolitanate of Karlovci, who contributed 30,000 bricks for the construction. The chapel underwent renovations between 1854 and 1855 and was restored again in 1923. In 1925, marking 1000 years of the Croatian Kingdom, the Catholics of Sremski Karlovci, led by parish priest Josip Bertić, placed a plaque on the chapel’s outer wall in honour of King Tomislav. However, it was vandalized and stolen in the 1990s at the time of Breakup of Yugoslavia.

== Protection ==
The building is listed as a cultural monument of exceptional importance under the central registry (ZM 26) since December 22, 1993, and in the local registry (ZM 4) since November 26, 1993. The responsible authority is the Provincial Institute for the Protection of Cultural Monuments in Novi Sad. The basis for registration is the decision of the Provincial Institute of SAP Vojvodina from 23 May 1963 (number 507/62), and the official classification was published in the Official Gazette of the Republic of Serbia 16/90.

== See also ==
- Sremski Karlovci Orthodox Cathedral
- Archives of Sremski Karlovci
- Treaty of Passarowitz
