= Saint Nicholas Cathedral, Sremski Karlovci =

Cathedral in Sremski Karlovci, Serbia

Saint Nicholas Cathedral
- Saint Nicholas Cathedral, pictured in 2010
- Saint Nicholas Cathedral
- 45.2029°N 19.9342°E
- Location: Sremski Karlovci
- Country: Serbia
- Denomination: Serbian Orthodox Church

History
- Status: Church
- Founded: 1758
- Dedication: Saint Nicholas

Architecture
- Functional status: Active

Administration
- Diocese: Eparchy of Srem

The Saint Nicholas Cathedral (Serbian: Саборна црква Светог Николе, romanized: Saborna crkva Svetog Nikole), also known as the Sremski Karlovci Cathedral (Serbian: Саборна црква у Сремским Карловцима, romanized: Saborna crkva u Sremskim Karlovcima), is an Eastern Orthodox church located in Sremski Karlovci, Serbia. It is under jurisdiction of the Eparchy of Srem of the Serbian Orthodox Church and serves as its cathedral church.

Dedicated to Saint Nicholas, it was historically (together with the Palace of the Patriarchate) the seat of the Metropolitanate and Patriarchate of Karlovci, which played a crucial role in the religious and cultural life of Serbs in the Habsburg Monarchy.

Constructed between 1758 and 1762 during the time of Pavle Nenadović, the cathedral is one of the most important examples of Baroque religious architecture in Serbia. It was designed with influences from Central European architectural styles, and its two bell towers and richly decorated interior reflect the artistic aspirations of the Serbian Orthodox Church in the 18th century. The church has undergone multiple restorations, including major works in 1805, 1909, and the 21st century. It is protected as a cultural heritage site of exceptional importance.

== History ==
The Saint Nicholas Cathedral was constructed between 1758 and 1762, under the patronage of Metropolitan Pavle Nenadović, a prominent figure in the Serbian Orthodox Church during the Habsburg era. It was built on the site of an earlier church dating back to the Ottoman period in Pannonian Basin before 1699 Treaty of Karlowitz, which was demolished to make way for a new cathedral befitting the status of Sremski Karlovci as the spiritual and administrative centre of the Serbian Orthodox Church in the Habsburg Monarchy.

The architectural plans for the new cathedral were prepared in Vienna. The main construction work was overseen by Kosta Cincarin and Johannes, a German builder. In 1760, the towers and dome were added according to designs by the Serbian polymath and artist Zaharije Orfelin, who was then residing in the town. The cathedral was completed and consecrated in 1762.

A devastating fire in 1799 severely damaged the building, prompting a comprehensive reconstruction completed in 1805. A further restoration was carried out in 1811, during which the cathedral acquired neoclassical elements, particularly in its interior. In 1909, architect Vladimir Nikolić led another major renovation that transformed the cathedral’s façade, replacing its Baroque character with a Renaissance Revival design. This version of the façade has remained largely unchanged since.

During the 20th century, the cathedral underwent additional conservation efforts. The iconostasis was restored between 1972 and 1975, while the building itself was repaired in 1991–1994 and again in 2006. A major renovation of the exterior façade was completed in 2020.

== See also ==
- List of cathedrals in Serbia

== Sources ==
- Bogdan Janjušević (2017). Saborna crkva Svetog oca Nikolaja u Sremskim Karlovcima [The Cathedral Church of St. Nicholas in Sremski Karlovci]. Pokrajinski zavod za zaštitu spomenika kulture Petrovaradin. ISBN 9788685869853.
