= Sremski Karlovci =

Sremski Karlovci Сремски Карловци (Serbian)
- Town and municipality
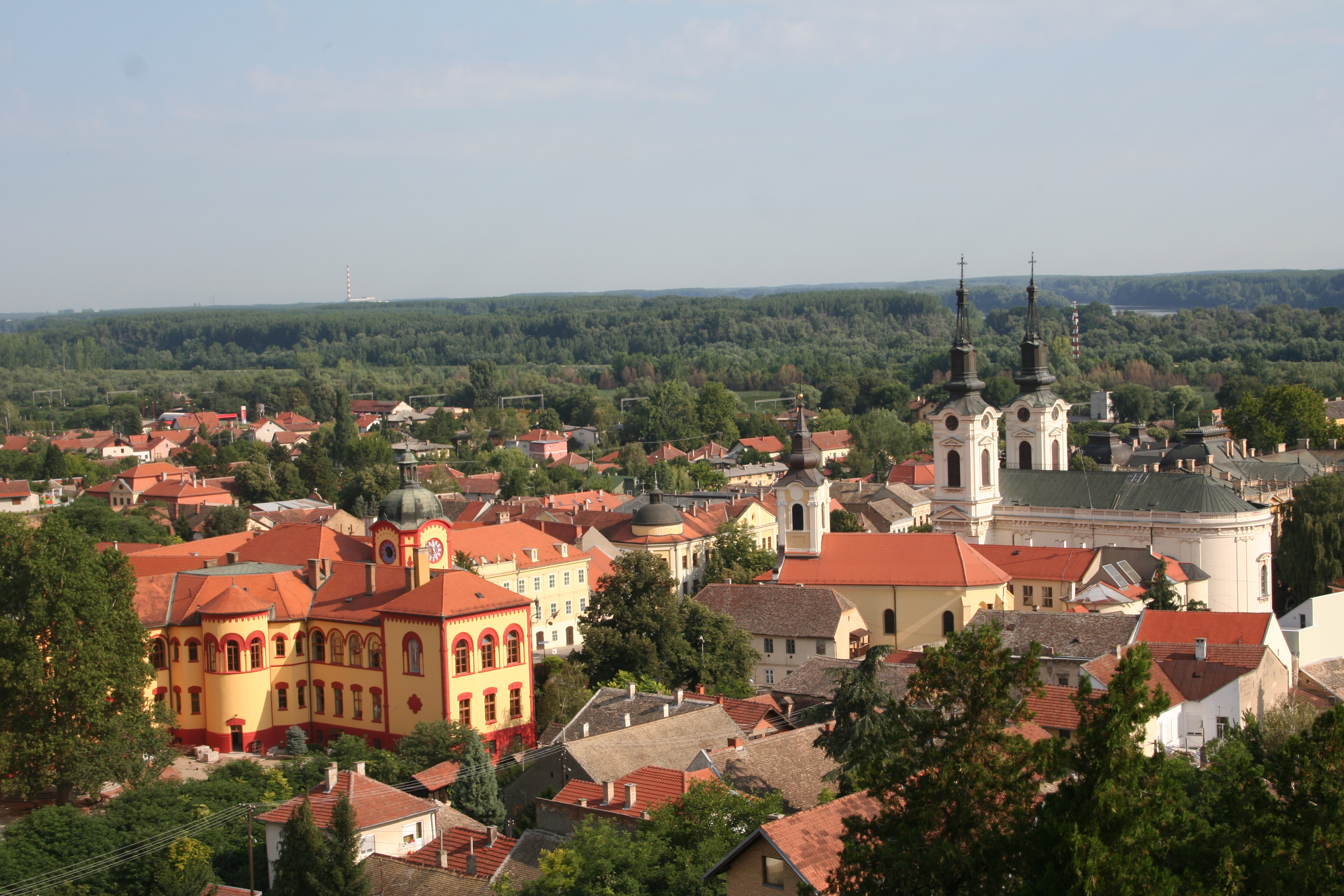
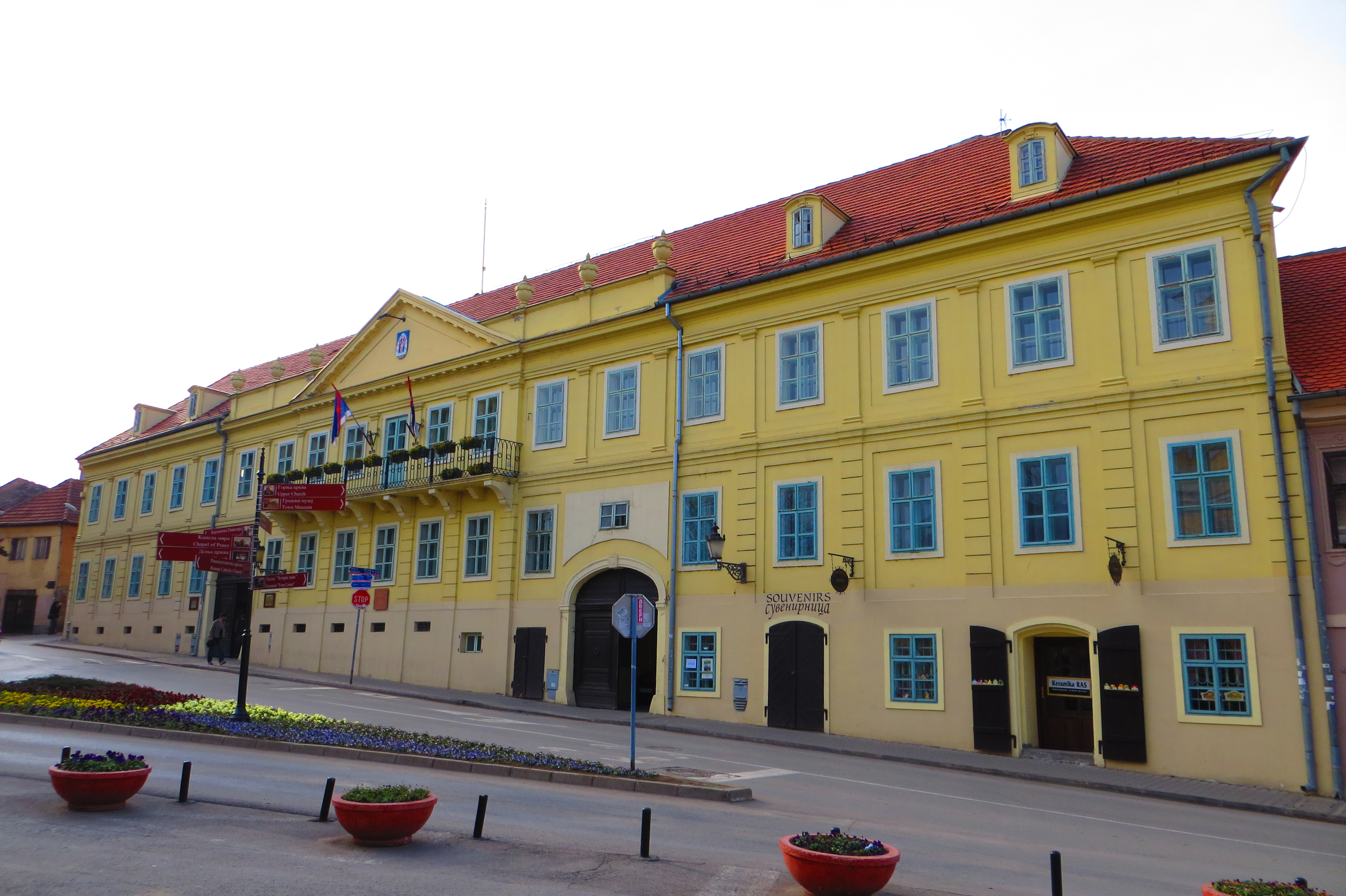
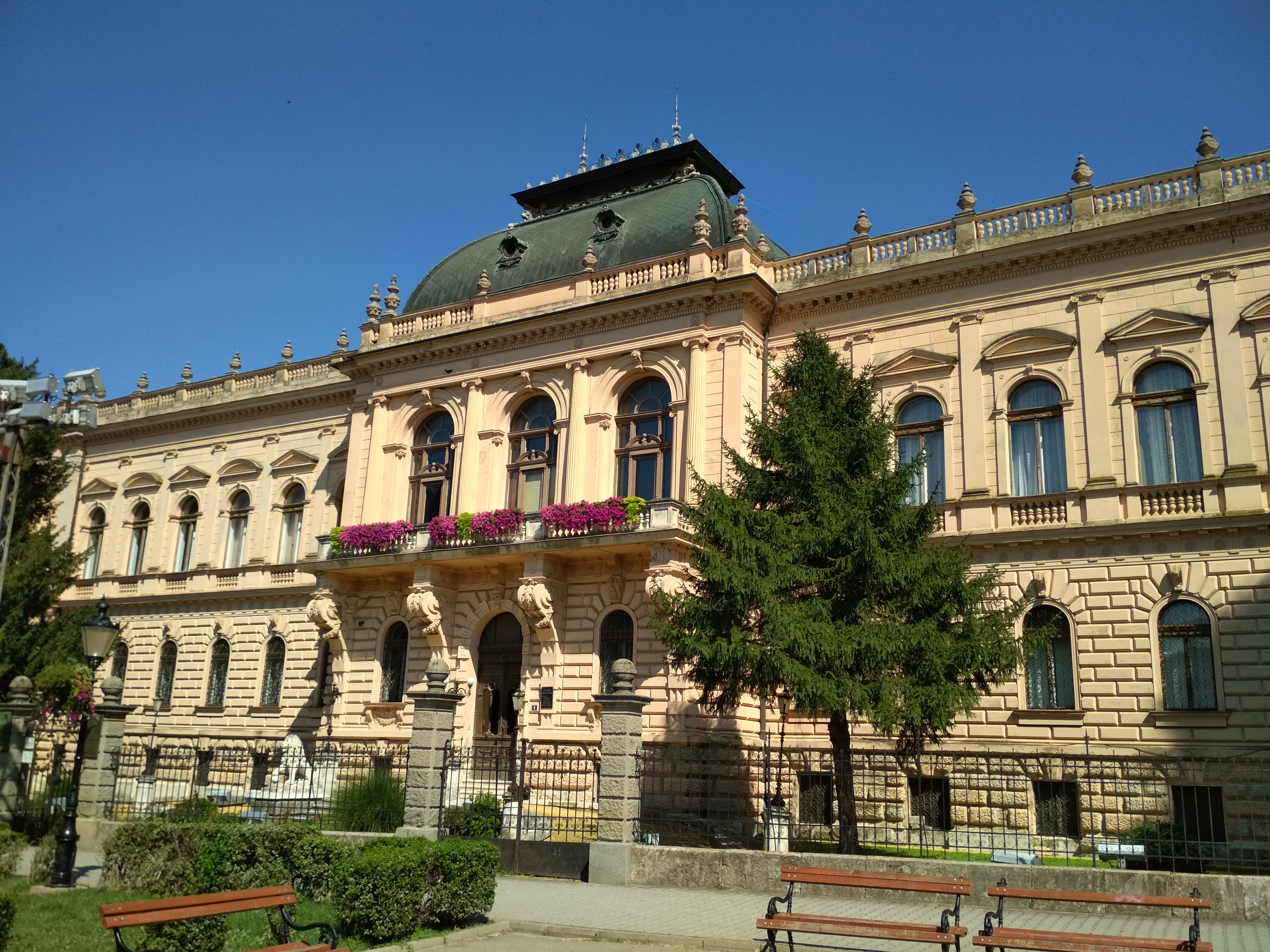
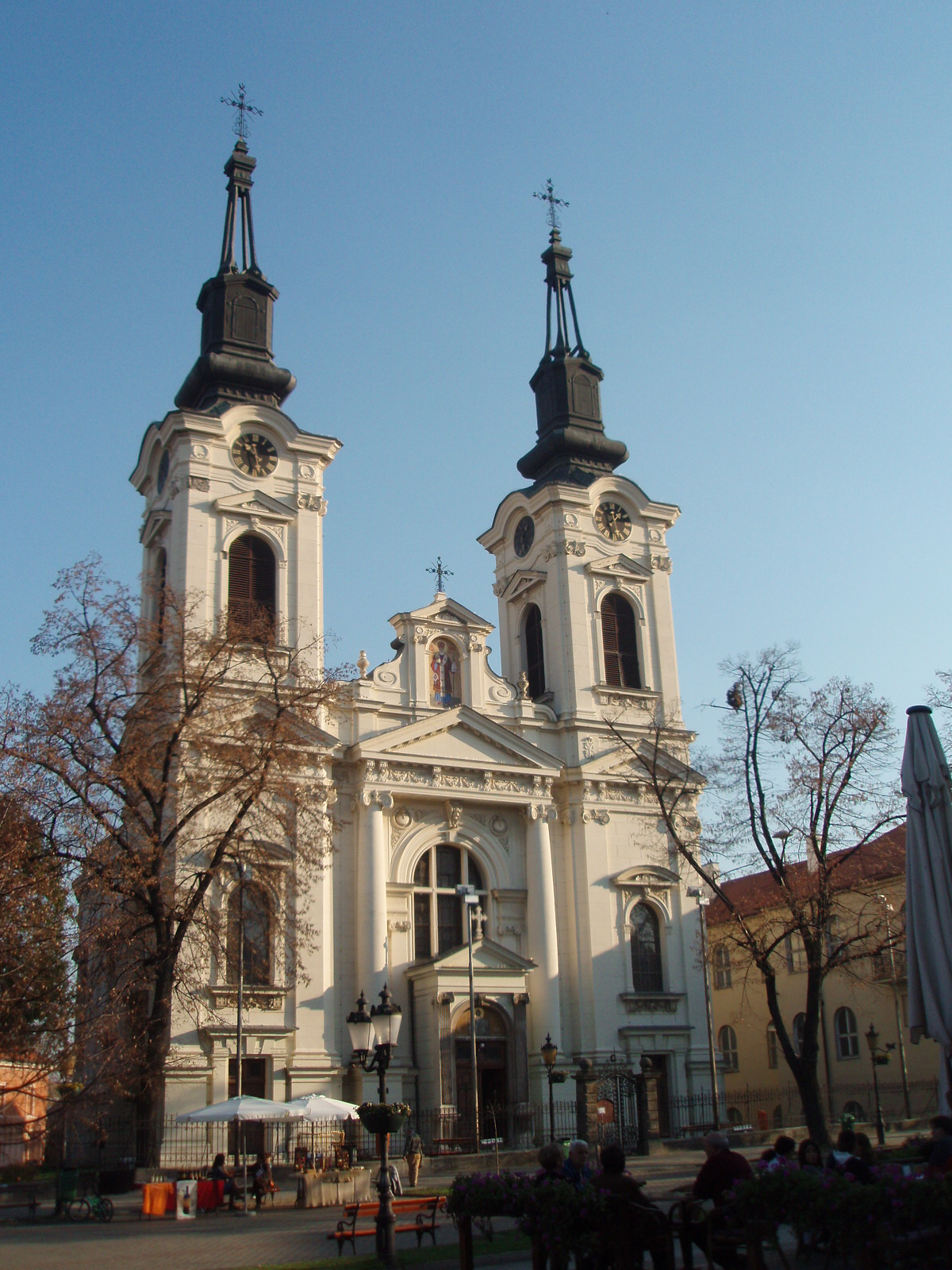
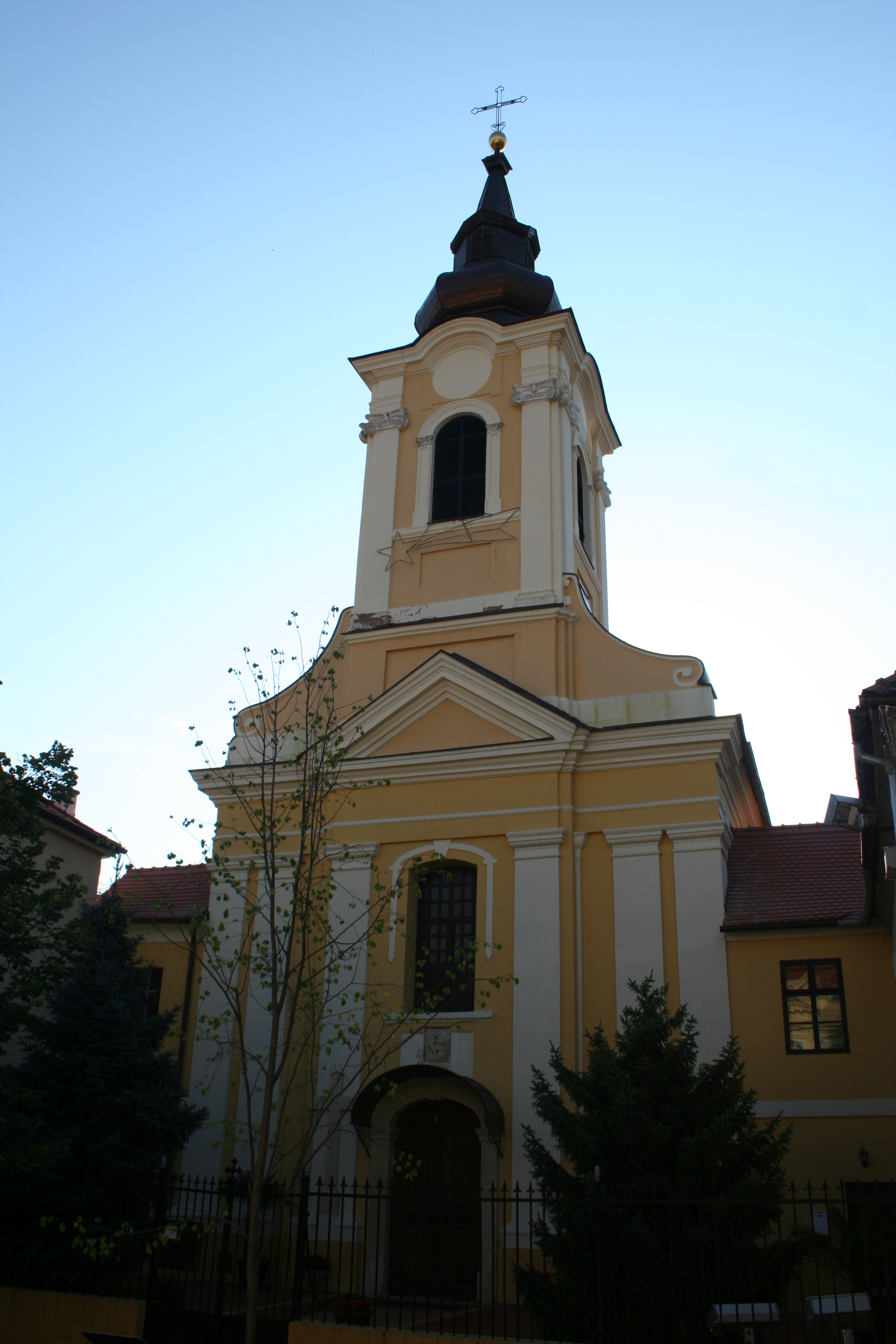
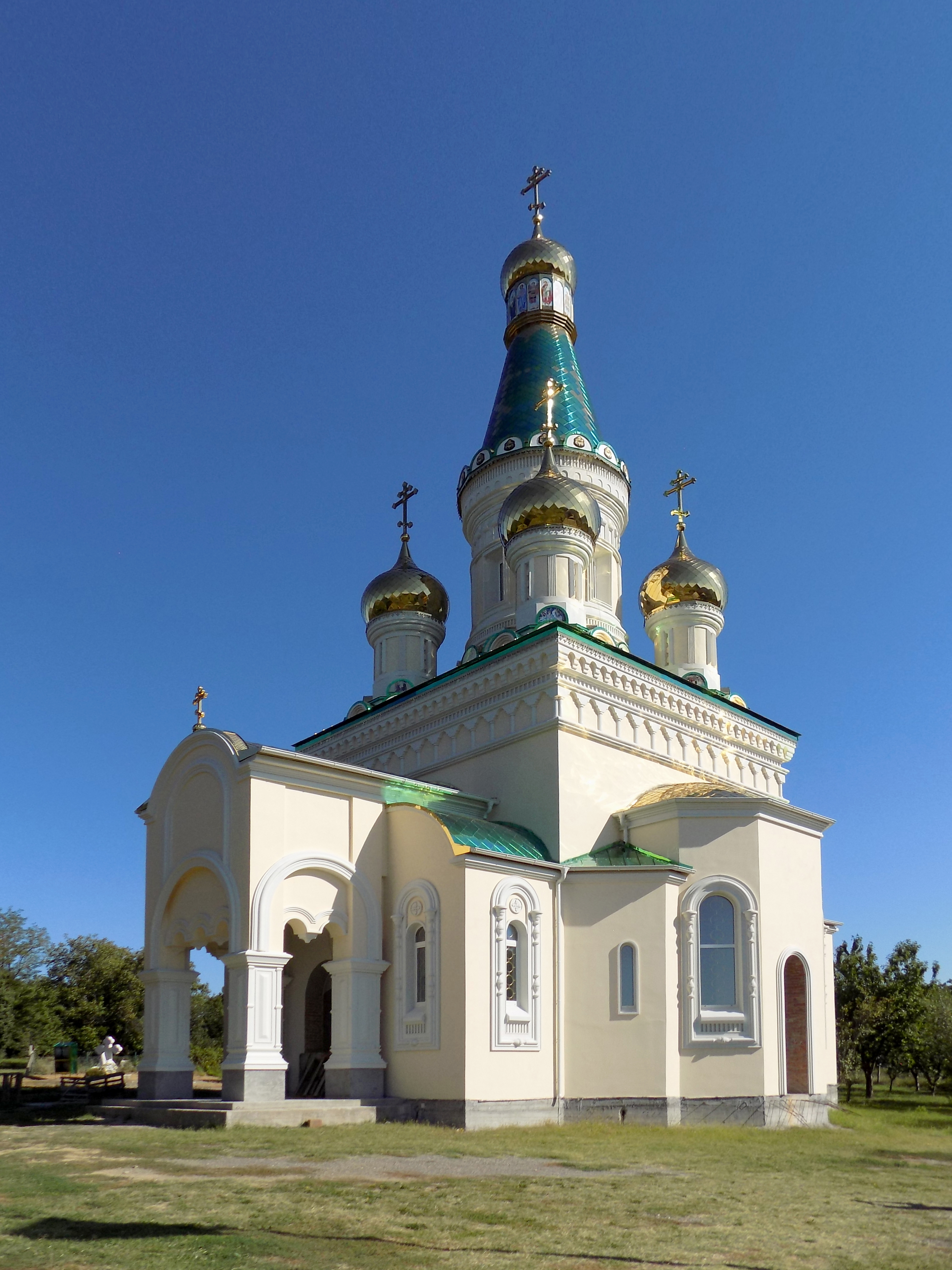
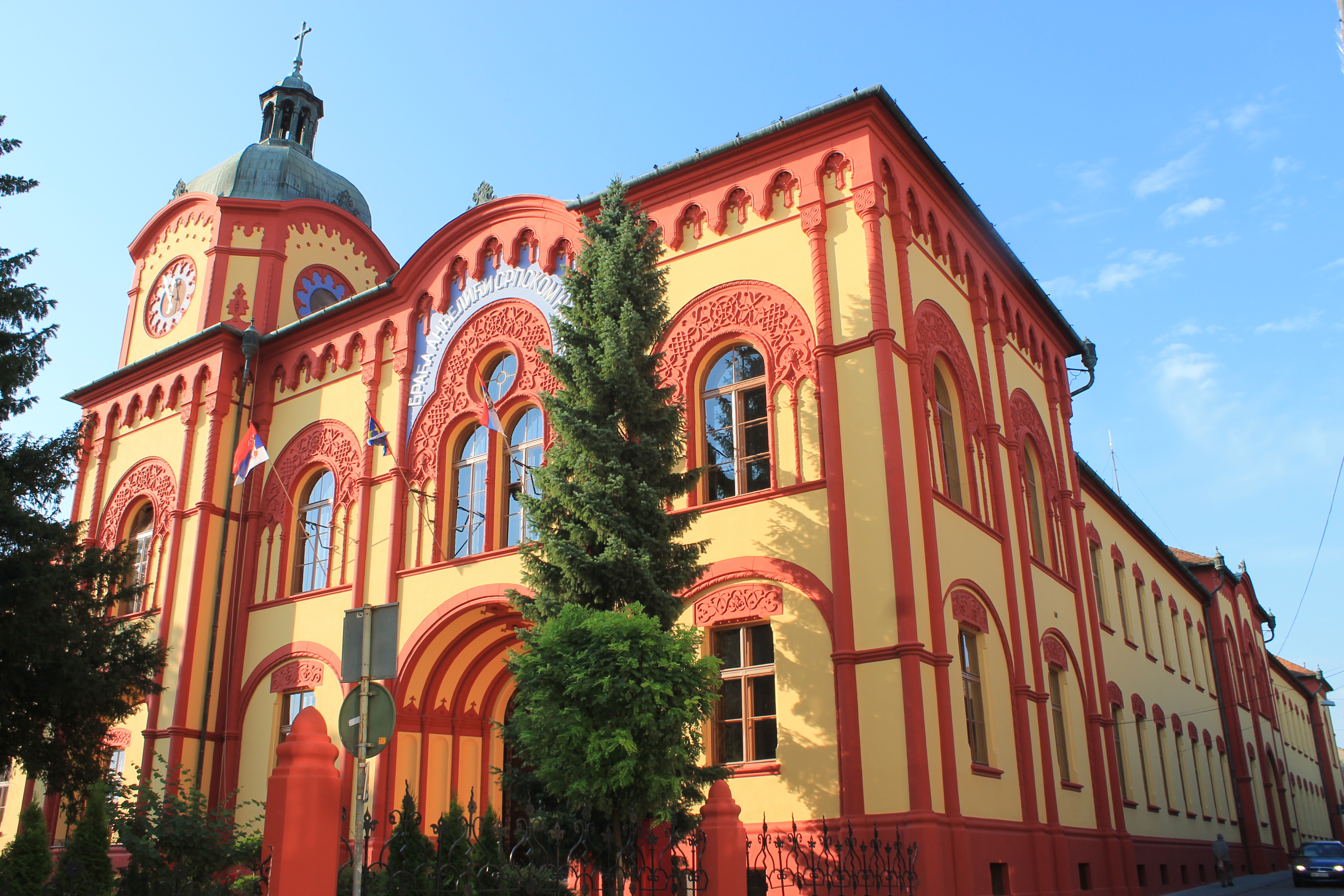
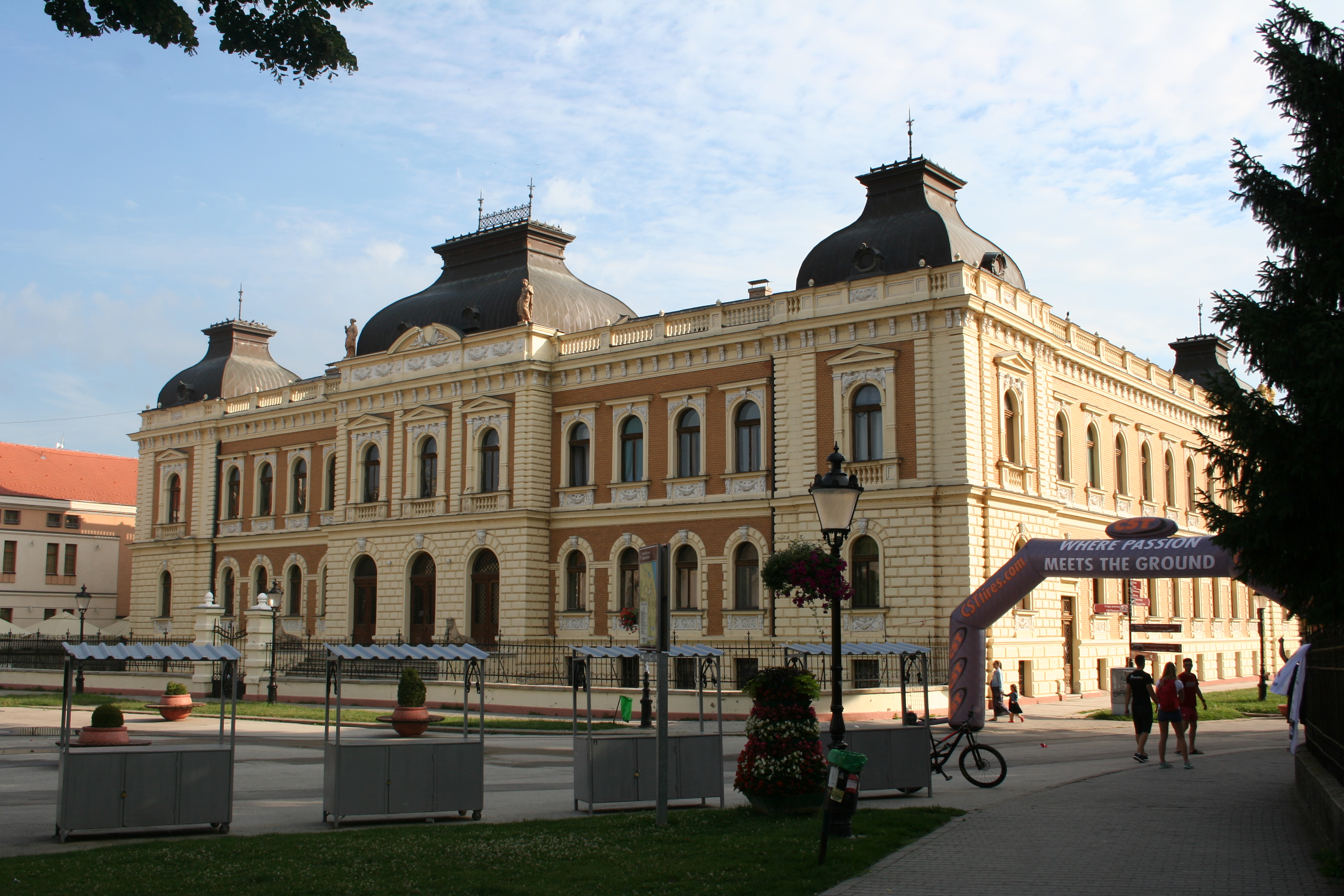
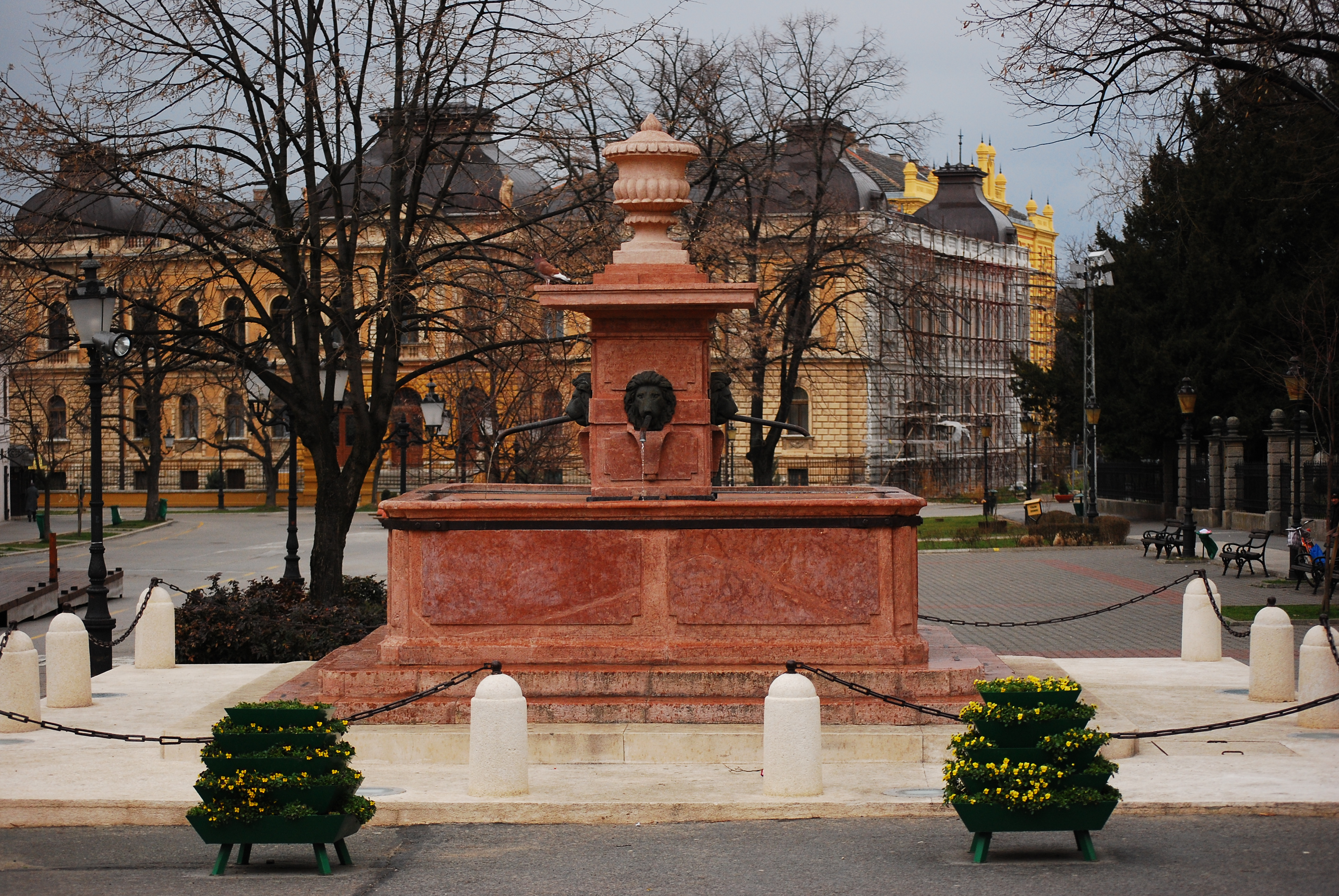
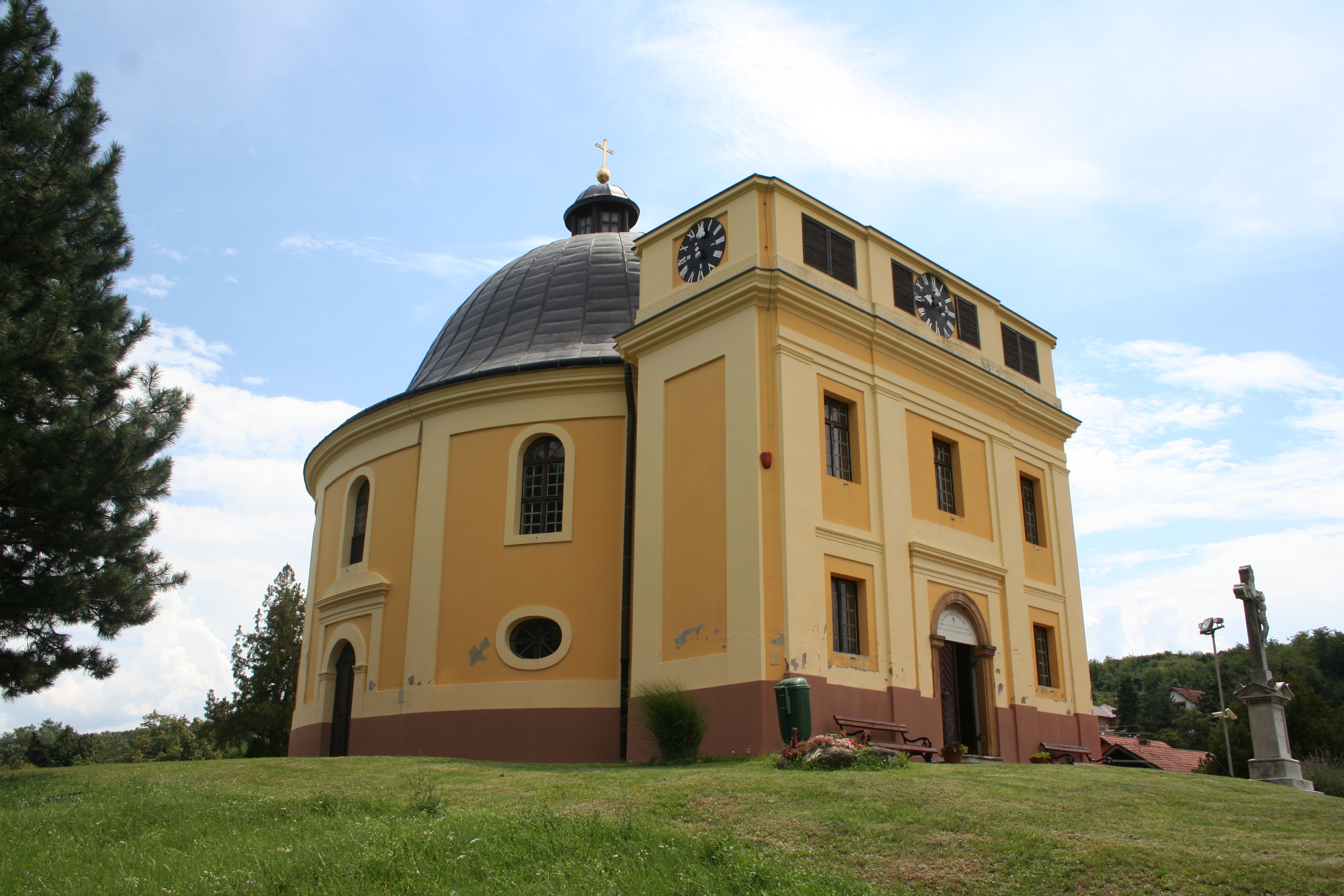
- Panorama of Sremski Karlovci Town Hall Palace of the Patriarchate Saint Nicholas Cathedral Church of the Holy Trinity Church of the Most Holy Theotokos Karlovci Gymnasium Saint Arsenije Seminary Four Lions Fountain Chapel of Peace

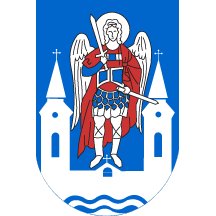
- Coat of arms

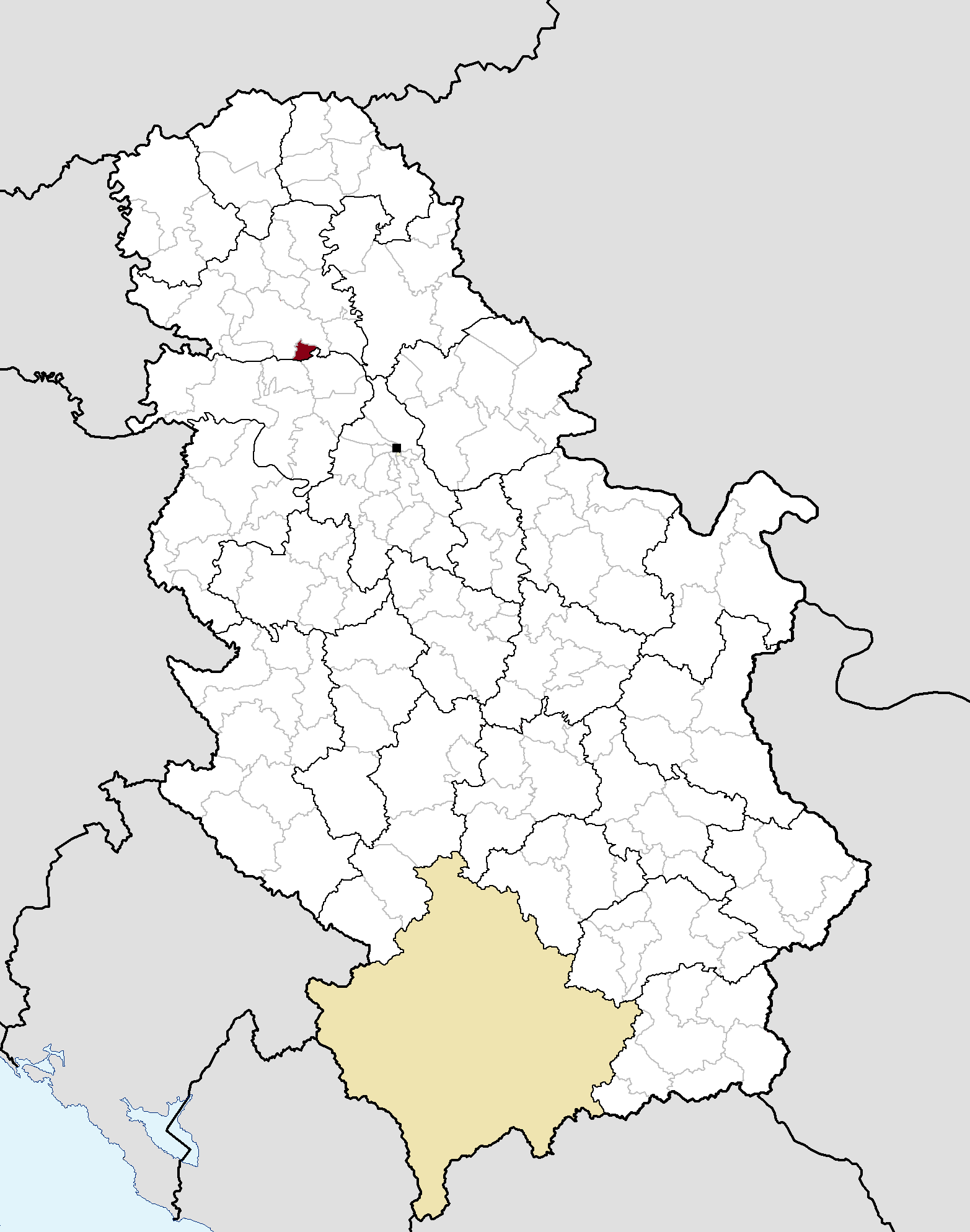
- Location of the municipality of Sremski Karlovci within Serbia
- Coordinates: 45°12′10″N 19°56′01″E
- Country: Serbia
- Province: Vojvodina
- Region: Syrmia
- District: South Bačka
- Municipality: Sremski Karlovci
- Settlements: 1

Government
  - Mayor: Dražen Đurđić (SNS)

Area
  - Municipality: 49.76 km^{2} (19.21 sq mi)
- Elevation: 87 m (285 ft)

Population (2022 census)
  - Town: 7,872
  - Town density: 158.2/km^{2} (409.7/sq mi)
  - Municipality: 7,872
- Time zone: UTC+1 (CET)
  - Summer (DST): UTC+2 (CEST)
- Postal code: 21205
- Area code: +381(0)21
- Car plates: NS
- Official Language: Serbian Language
- Website: sremskikarlovci.rs

Sremski Karlovci (Serbian Cyrillic: Сремски Карловци, pronounced [srêːmskiː kâːrloːʋt͡si]) is a town and municipality located in the South Bačka District, province of Vojvodina, Serbia. It is situated on the banks of the Danube, 8 kilometres (5 miles) from Novi Sad. According to the 2022 census results, it has a population of 7,872 inhabitants.

The town has historically been known as the seat of the Serbian Orthodox Church in the Habsburg Monarchy as well as the political and cultural capital of Serbian Vojvodina during the Revolution in 1848.

== Etymology ==
In Serbian, the town is known as Sremski Karlovci (Сремски Карловци), in Croatian as Srijemski Karlovci, in German as Karlowitz or Carlowitz, in Hungarian as Karlóca, in Polish as Karłowice, in Romanian as Carloviț and in Turkish as Karlofça. The former Serbian name used for the town was Karlovci (Карловци), which is also used today, albeit unofficially. The name of the town in Serbian is plural.

== Geography ==
The town is situated along the Danube River, about 12 km from Novi Sad and 75 km from Belgrade, in the geographical region of Syrmia. The town of Sremski Karlovci is the only settlement in the municipality.

== History ==
=== Middle Ages ===
The town was first mentioned in historical documents in 1308 with the name Karom. The medieval fortress of Karom was built on the ruins of the ancient Roman one. Until 1521, Karom was a possession of Hungarian noble families, of whom the most well known were Báthory and Morović.

In 1521, Ottoman military commander Bali-beg conquered Karom under the Ottoman Empire's invasion of Europe. During the next 170 years, the town was part of the Ottoman Empire. The Slavic name for the town – Karlovci, was first recorded in 1532/33. During Ottoman rule, the town was still predominately Serbian in ethnicity, with the smaller part of population composed of Muslims. According to the Ottoman defterler from 1545, the population of Karlovci numbered 547 Christian (Serb) houses. The city also had three Orthodox churches and a monastery. From 1557, it belonged to Eparchy of Belgrade and Srem of the Serbian Patriarchate of Peć.

=== Modern period ===
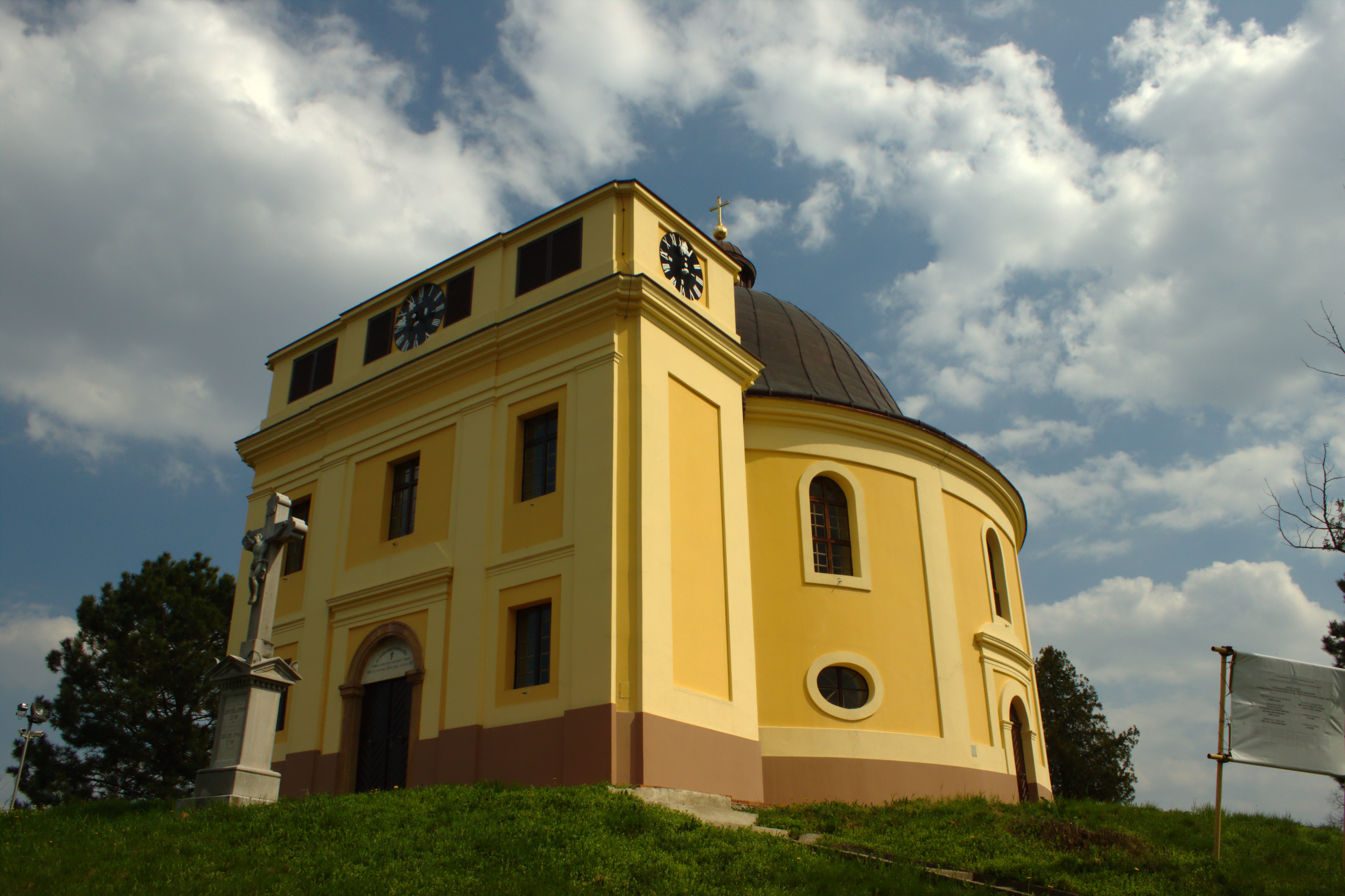
The Chapel of Peace, erected on the spot where the Treaty of Karlowitz was negotiated

Between 16 November 1698 and 26 January 1699, the town of Karlovci was the site of a congress that ended the hostilities between the Ottoman Empire and the Holy League, a coalition of various European powers including Habsburg monarchy, Poland, Venice and Russia. The congress produced the Treaty of Karlowitz. It was the first time a round table was used in international politics.

After this peace treaty, the town was considered part of the Habsburg monarchy and was included in its Military Frontier. According to 1702 data, the population was composed of 215 Orthodox and 13 Catholic houses. By 1753, the population of the town numbered 3,843 people, of which 3,110 were classified as ethnic Serbs.

The town was the spiritual, political and cultural center of the Serbs in the Habsburg Monarchy. The metropolitan of the Serbian Orthodox Church resided here and the Serbian Patriarch retains the title of Metropolitan of Karlovci to this day.

The town had the earliest Serb (and Slavic in general) gymnasium (Serbian: gimnazija/гимназија, French: lycée), founded on 3 August 1791. Three years later, the Eastern Orthodox seminary of Sremski Karlovci was founded here. It was the second-oldest Orthodox seminary in the world, after the Spiritual Academy in Kyiv, and it remains in operation today.

At the Serb National Assembly in Karlovci in May 1848, Serbs declared the unification of the regions of Syrmia, Banat, Bačka, and Baranya (including parts of the Military Frontier) into the province of Serbian Vojvodina. In the late 18th century, the Habsburg monarchy had invited numerous settlers from Bavaria and southern Germany into some of these regions along the Danube, in order to repopulate the area and re-establish agriculture after the effects of the Ottoman invasion and disease. The Germans, who became known as Danube-Swabians, were allowed to keep their language and Catholic religion. For more than a century, they had fairly autonomous settlements.

The first capital of Serbian Vojvodina was in Karlovci; it was later moved to Zemun, Veliki Bečkerek, and Timișoara. At the same time the title of the Orthodox Metropolitan of Karlovci was raised to that of Patriarch.

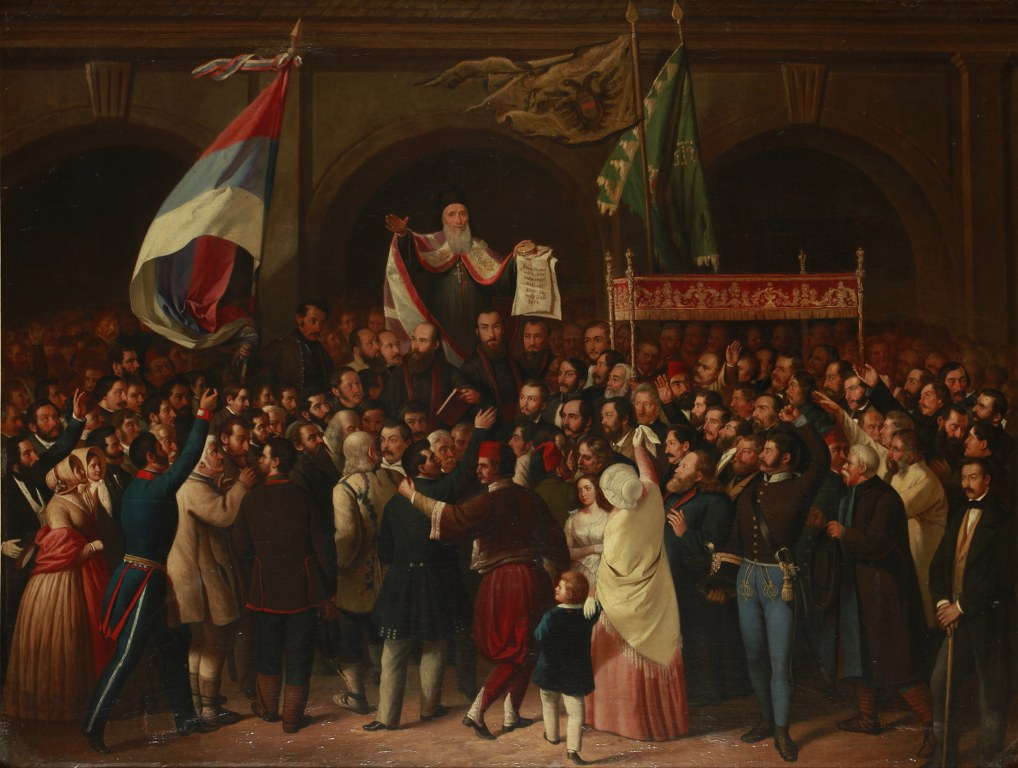
Proclamation of Serbian Vojvodina in 1848 in Sremski Karlovci

When Serbian Vojvodina was in 1849 organized as the new province named Voivodeship of Serbia and Banat of Temeschwar, the town of Karlovci was not included into this province. It was returned to the administration of the Military Frontier (a Petrovaradin regiment that was part of Slavonian Krajina). With the abolition in 1881 of the Military Frontier, the town was included in Syrmia County of Croatia-Slavonia, the autonomous kingdom within Kingdom of Hungary and Austria-Hungary.

An Orthodox Patriarchate of Karlovci operated in Karlovci from 1848 until 1920. After World War I and the creation of the Kingdom of Yugoslavia, its territory was united with other Serbian ecclesiastical provinces to form the unified Serbian Orthodox Church, a process completed in 1920.

In 1918, the town became part of the Kingdom of Serbs, Croats and Slovenes (also known as the Kingdom of Yugoslavia). In the summer of 1921, the town's former palace of the Patriarch of Karlovci was used as the residence of Russian metropolitan Antony Khrapovitsky. Together with some refugee bishops from Russia, he organised what a few years later was instituted as the Holy Synod of the Russian Orthodox Church Outside Russia, at the time called the Karlovatsky Synod (Russian: Карловацкий синод), or Synod of Karlovci.)

Between 1921 and 1944 the Palace of the Patriarchate was the seat of the administration of the Russian Orthodox Church Outside Russia.

In 1922, the town became the headquarters of Russian White émigrés under the leadership of General Pyotr Nikolayevich Wrangel. In 1924 he set up the Russian All-Military Union, designed to include all Russian military émigrés the world over. Many emigres went to western Europe, especially France, and to the United States. A monument to Wrangel, sculpted by Vasiliy Azemsha, was unveiled in September 2007 in Karlovci.

Between 1929 and 1941, the town was part of Danube Banovina, a province of the Kingdom of Yugoslavia.

=== World War II ===
During World War II (1941–1944), after Nazi Germany's invasion of eastern Europe, the town was occupied by forces of the Axis Powers. It was attached to the Independent State of Croatia and Genocide of Serbs by Nazi Ustasha Croatian forces. During that time its name was changed to "Hrvatski Karlovci". After the annihilation of the Axis Croatian Nazi state by the Yugoslav Partisans. The previous name Sremski Karlovci was recovered.

=== Contemporary period ===
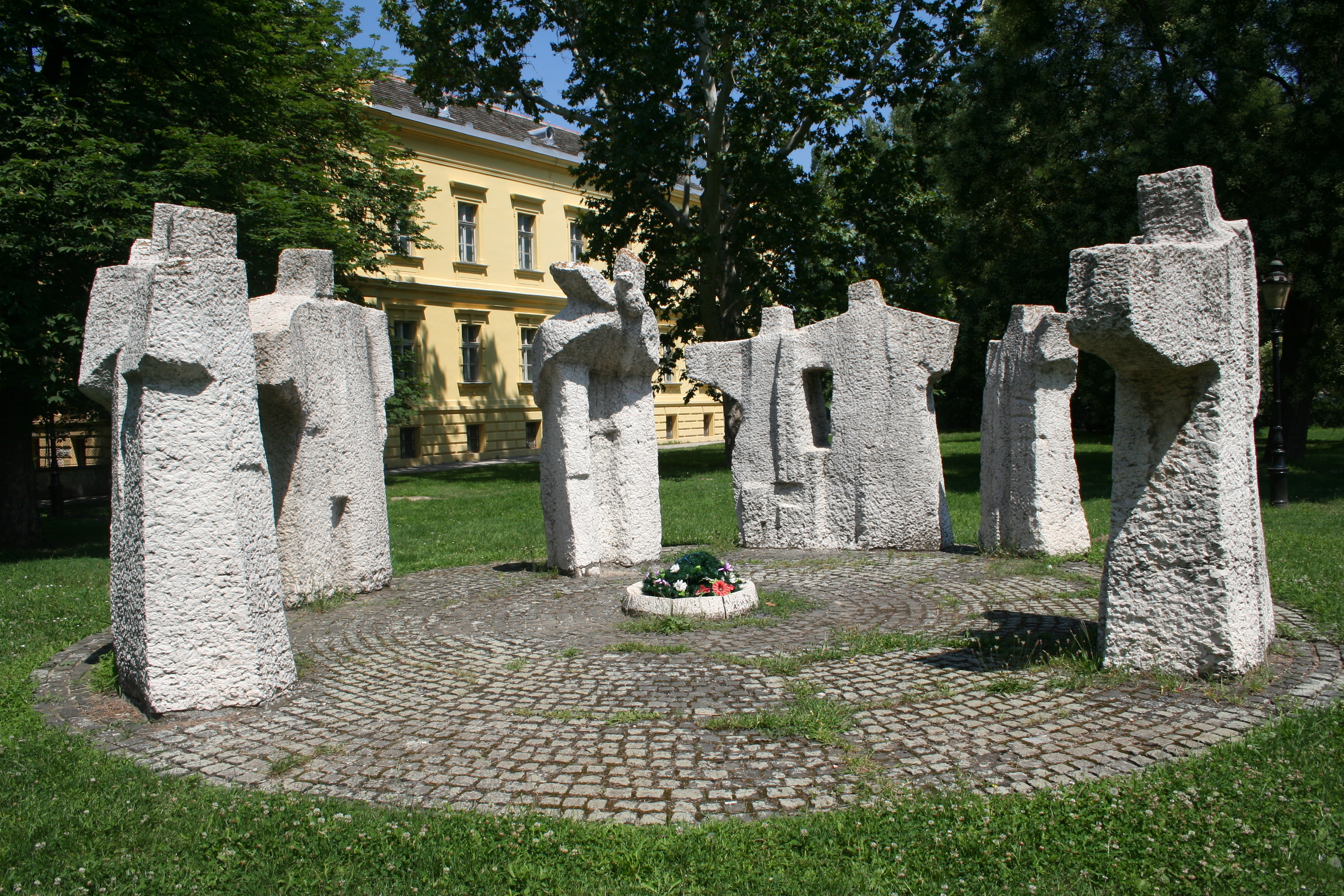
Monument dedicated to fallen soldiers of the World War II

Between 1980 and 1989, Sremski Karlovci was one of the seven municipalities of the city of Novi Sad.

== Demographics ==
Historical population
Year	Pop.	±%
1948	5,350	—
1953	5,618	+5.0%
1961	6,390	+13.7%
1971	7,040	+10.2%
1981	7,547	+7.2%
1991	7,534	−0.2%
2002	8,839	+17.3%
2011	8,750	−1.0%
2022	7,872	−10.0%

According to data from the 2011 census, ethnic composition of the municipality of Sremski Karlovci was as follows:

Ethnic group	Population	%
Serbs	6,820	77.94%
Croats	576	6.58%
Hungarians	182	2.08%
Yugoslavs	71	0.81%
Germans	63	0.72%
Montenegrins	41	0.47%
Slovaks	29	0.33%
Macedonians	25	0.29%
Rusyns	16	0.18%
Slovenes	15	0.17%
Romani	14	0.16%
Russians	11	0.13%
Others	969	11.07%
Total	8,750	

== Politics ==
From 1947 to 1989, Sremski Karlovci formed one of the city municipalities of the City of Novi Sad. After Novi Sad merged six of its municipalities into one City of Novi Sad, a referendum was held in Sremski Karlovci and a separate municipality was established. Although Sremski Karlovci lies in Syrmia region, the municipality belongs in South Bačka District, because of its close proximity to Novi Sad.

== Education ==
- Karlovci Gymnasium (the oldest secondary school in Serbia)
- Saint Arsenije Serbian Orthodox Seminary
- Faculty of Management
- College of Applied Studies in Management and Business Communication

== Buildings and structures ==
- Educational historical buildings:
  - Karlovci Gymnasium
  - Saint Arsenije Seminary
- Administrative buildings:
  - Town Hall
- Religious buildings
  - Palace of the Patriarchate
  - Saint Nicholas Cathedral
  - Holy Trinity Church
- Other buildings
  - Four Lions Fountain
  - Chapel of Peace
  - Archives of Sremski Karlovci

== Twin towns ==
Sremski Karlovci is twinned with:

- Bardejov, Slovakia
- Karpoš, North Macedonia
- Prnjavor, Bosnia and Herzegovina
- Tivat, Montenegro (2007)

== Gallery ==
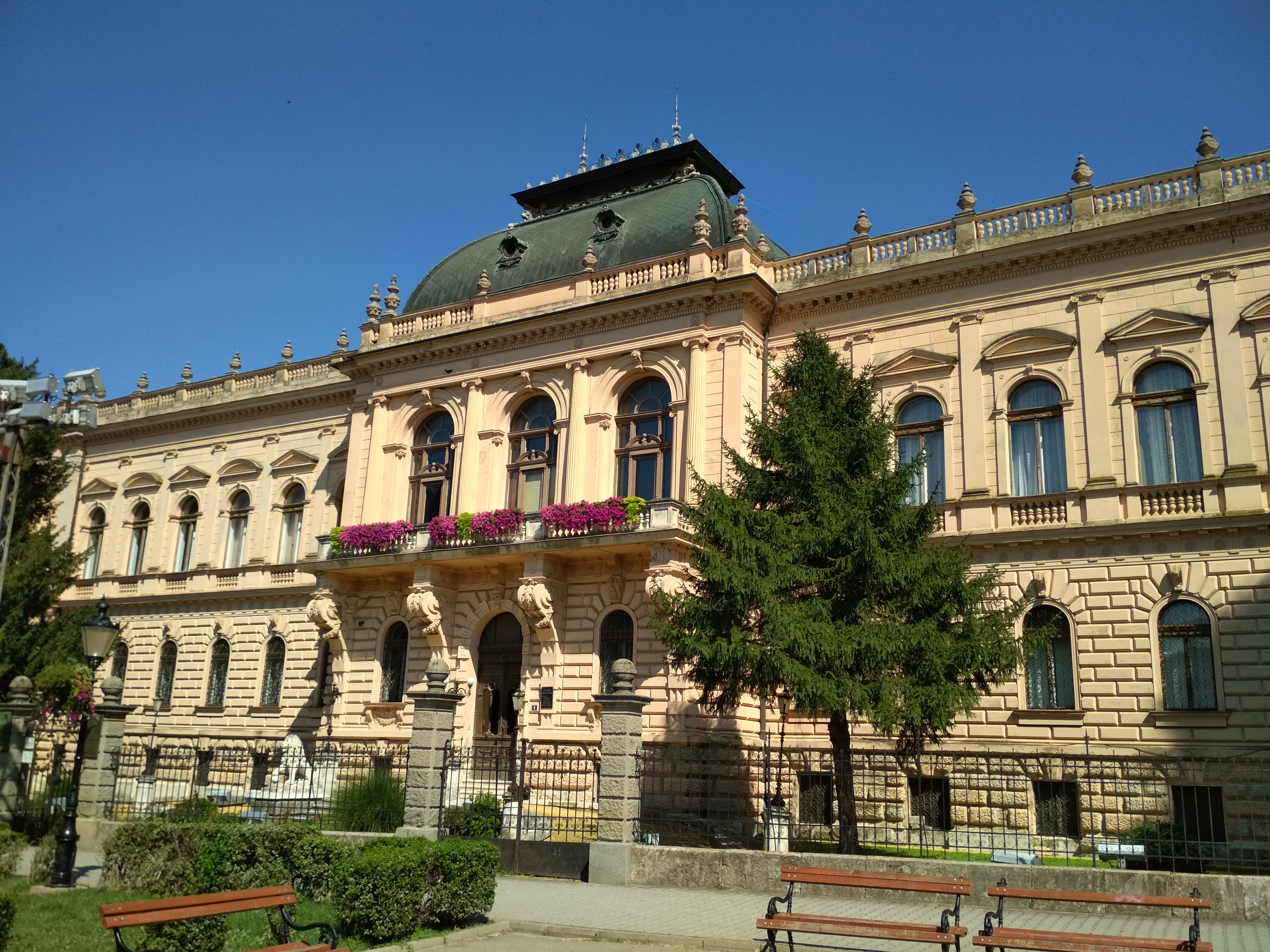
Palace of the Patriarchate

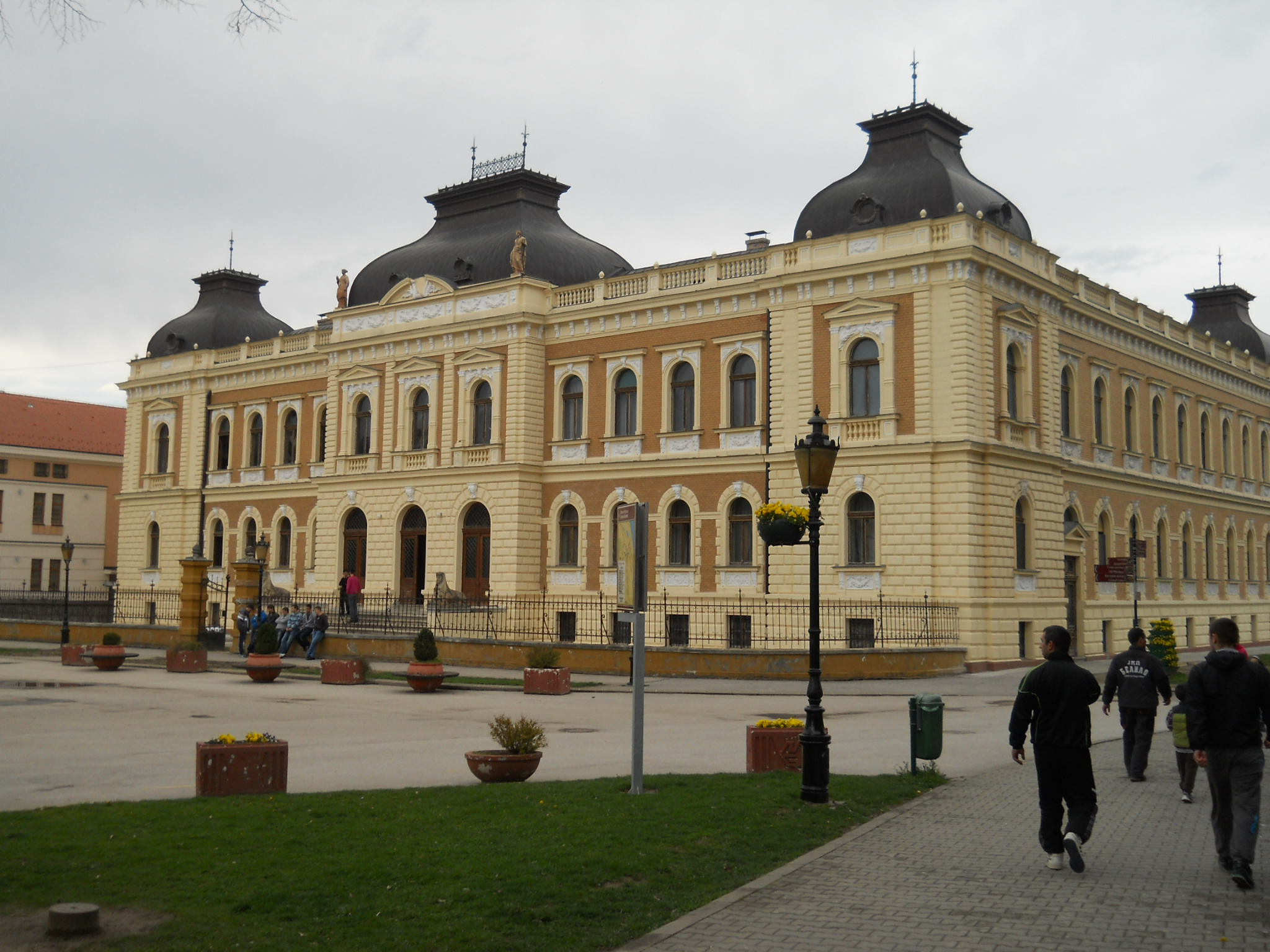
Saint Arsenije Seminary

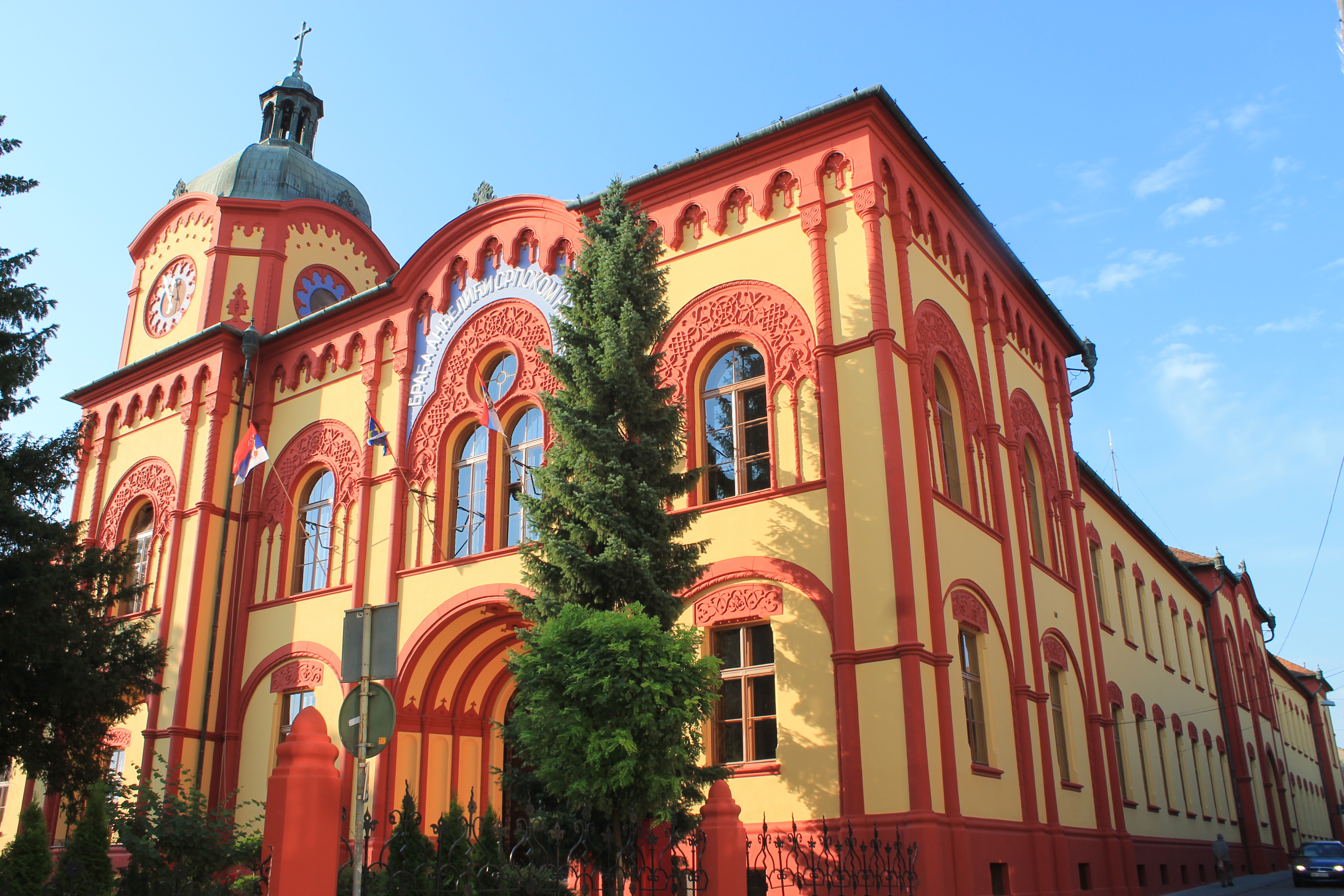
Karlovci Gymnasium

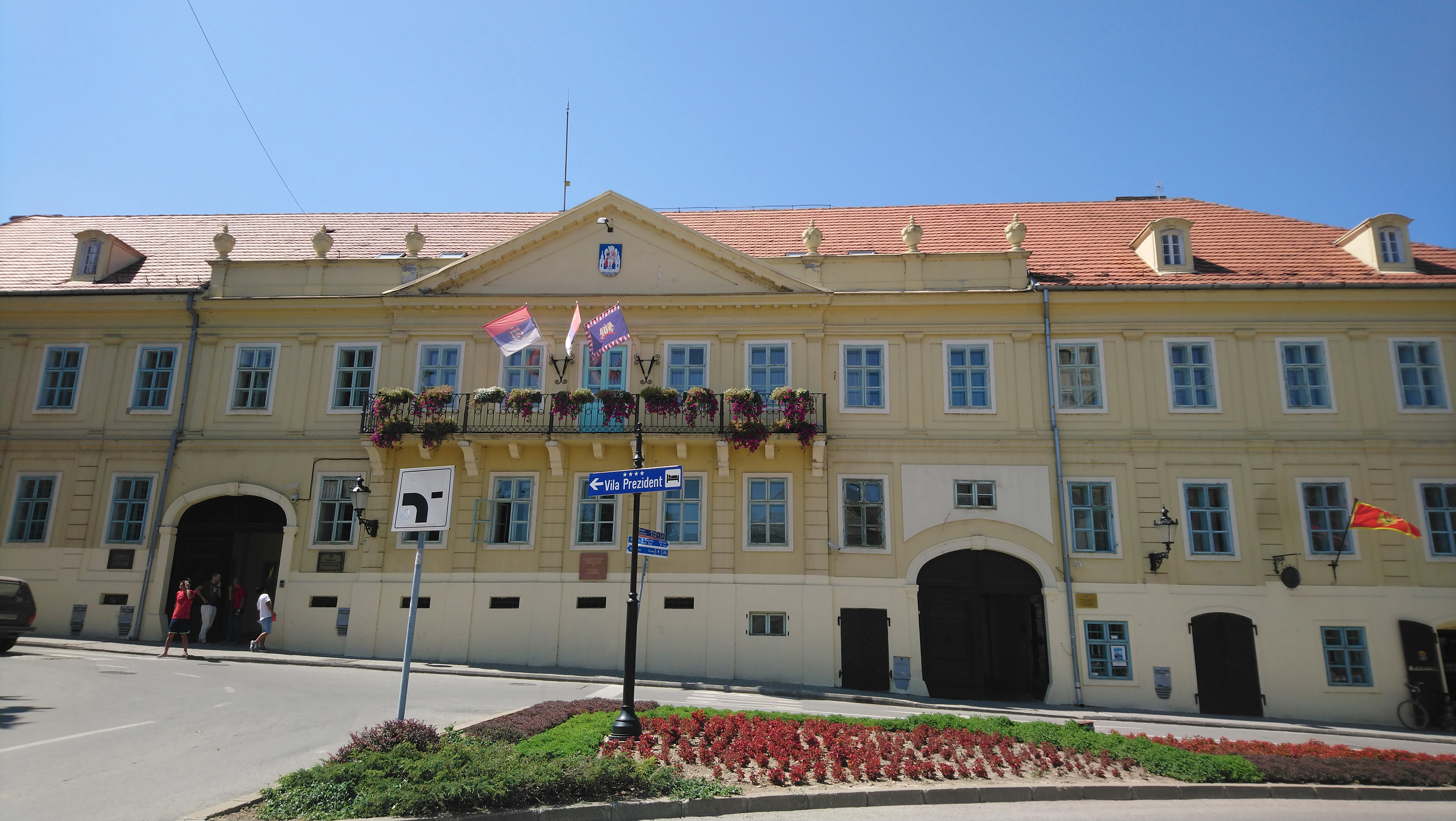
Town Hall

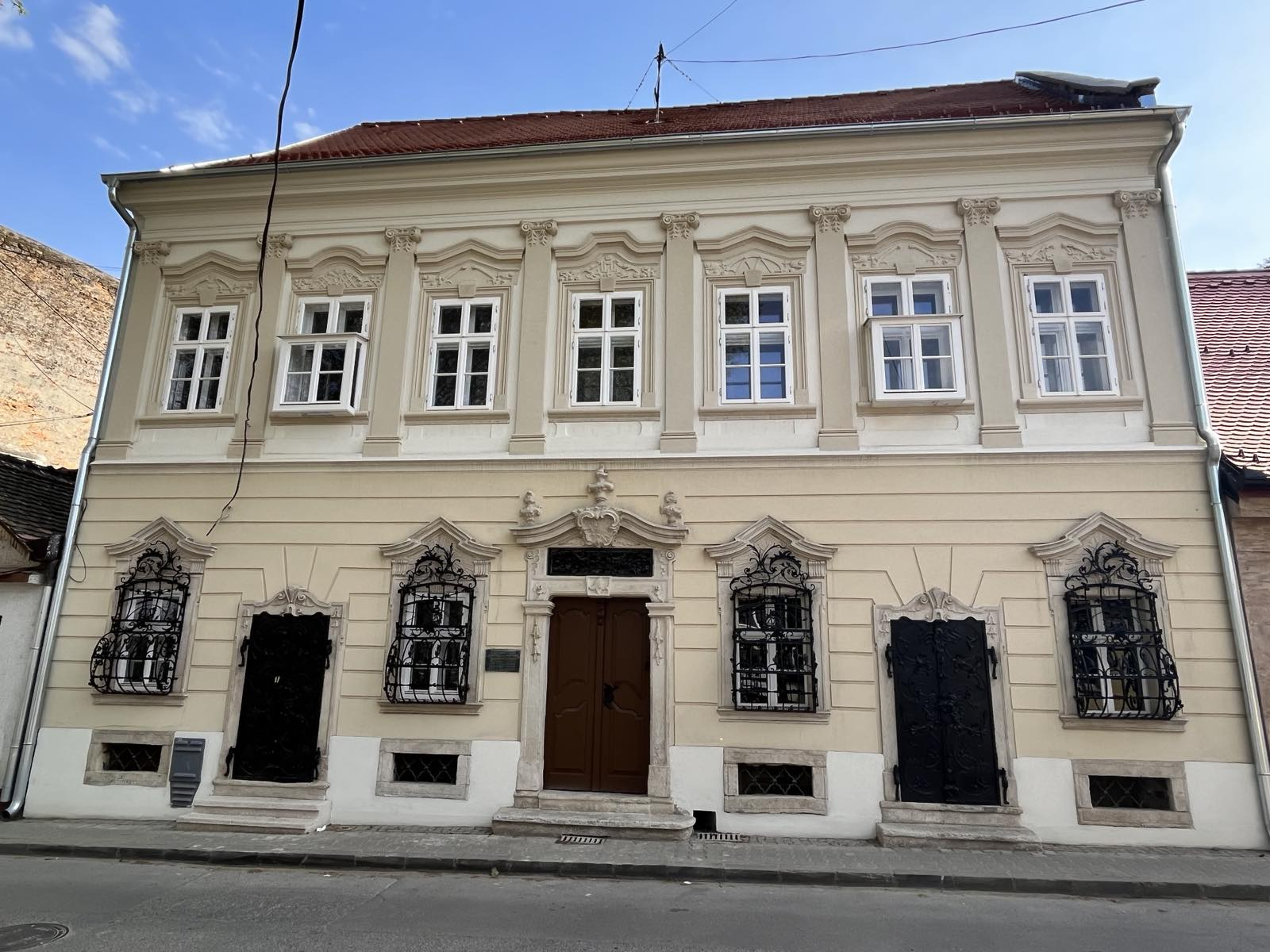
Sabov-Dejanović House
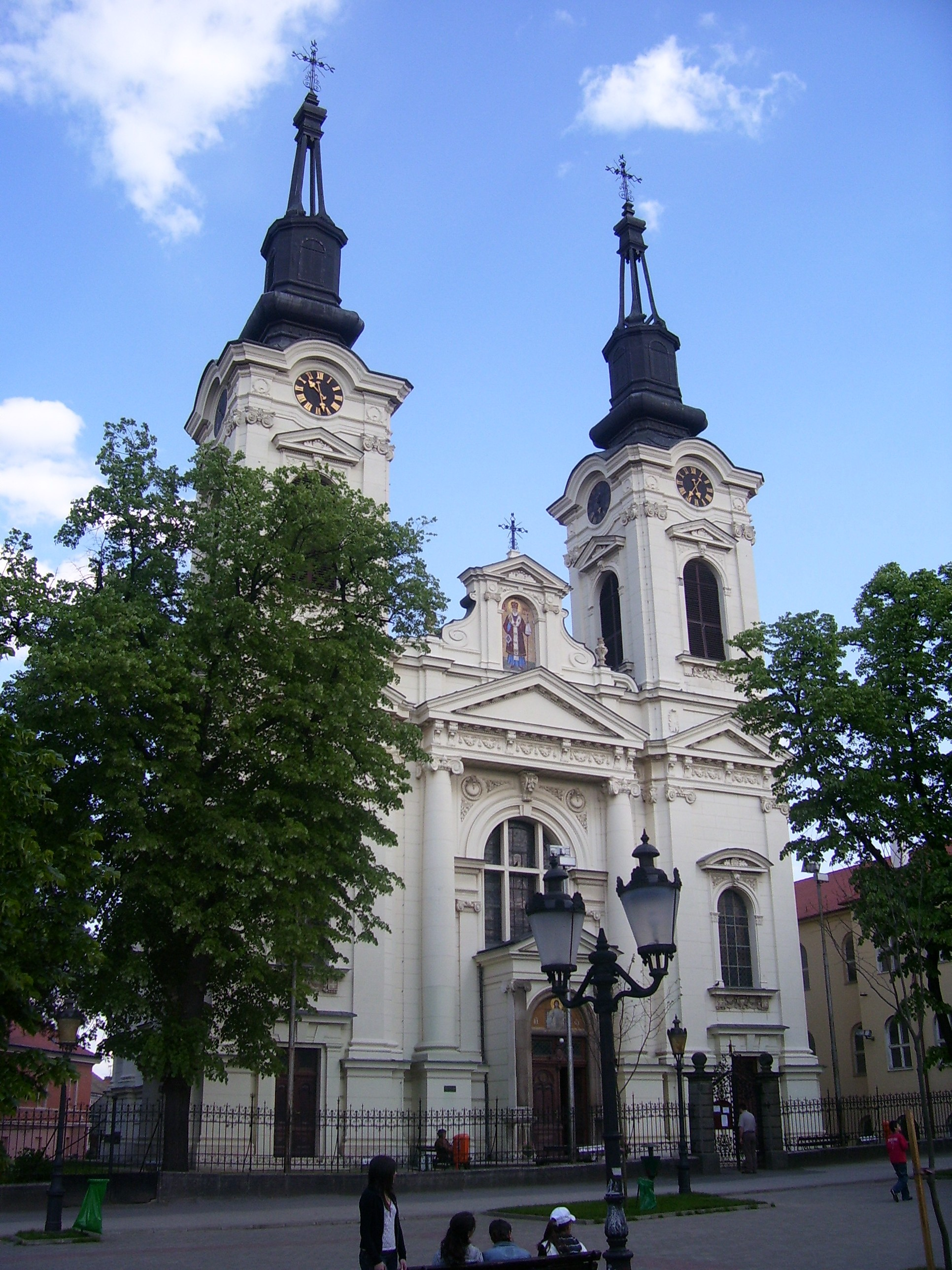
Saint Nicholas Cathedral

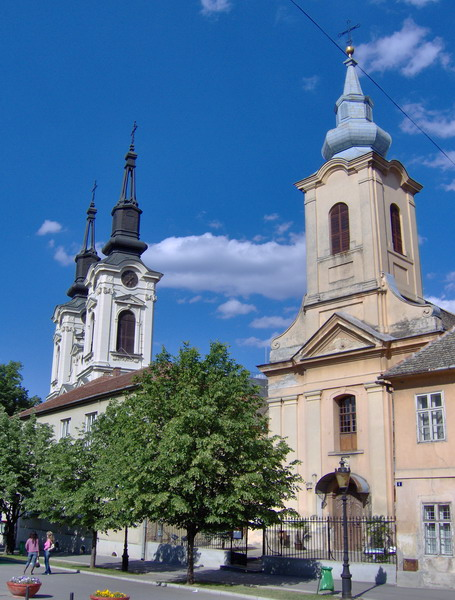
Orthodox and Catholic churches

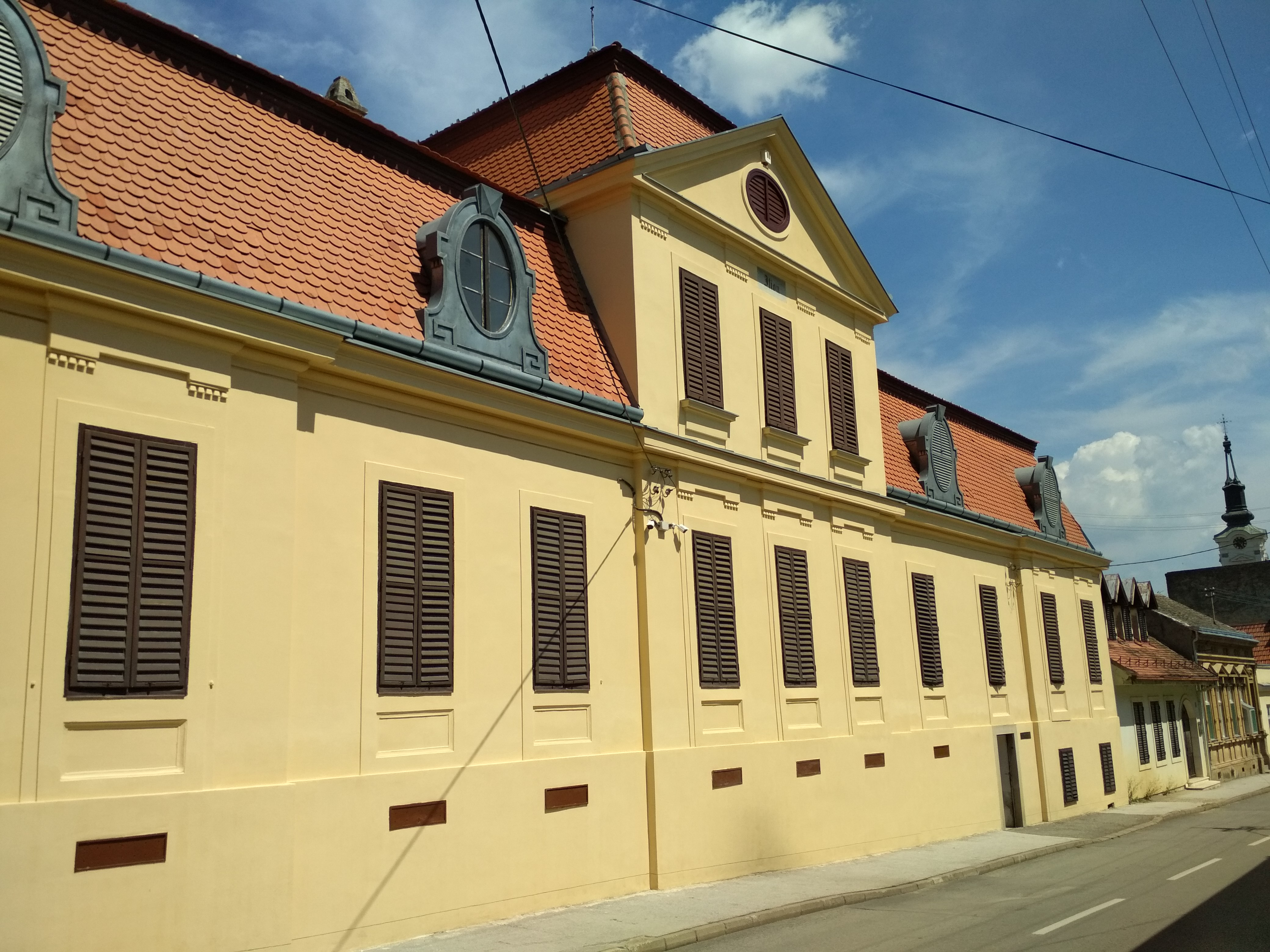
Municipal museum

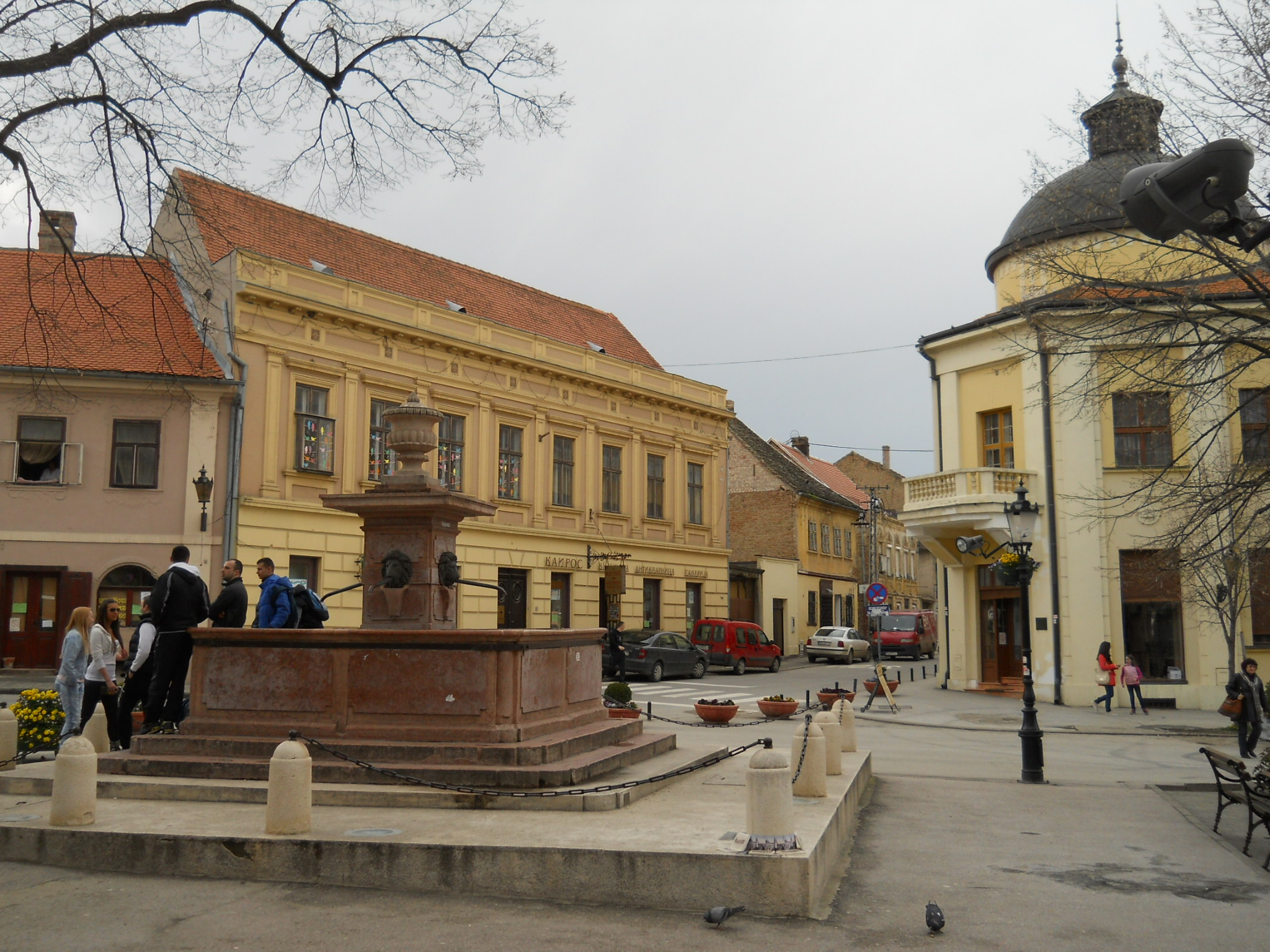
Four Lions Fountain

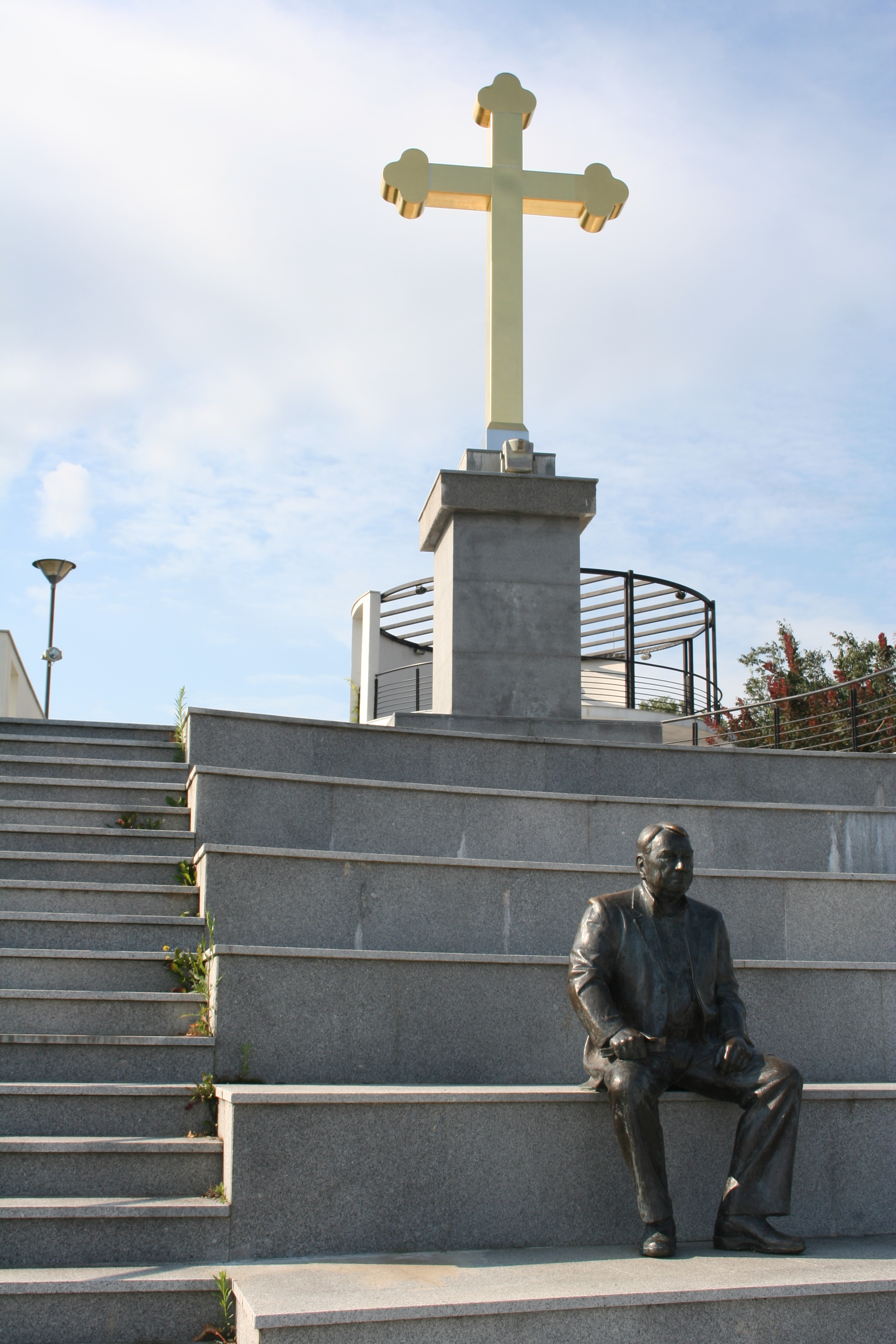
Duško Trifunović Monument

== See also ==
- Fruška Gora
- Syrmia
- List of places in Serbia
- List of cities, towns and villages in Vojvodina
