= Sremski Karlovci Town Hall =

- Magistrat
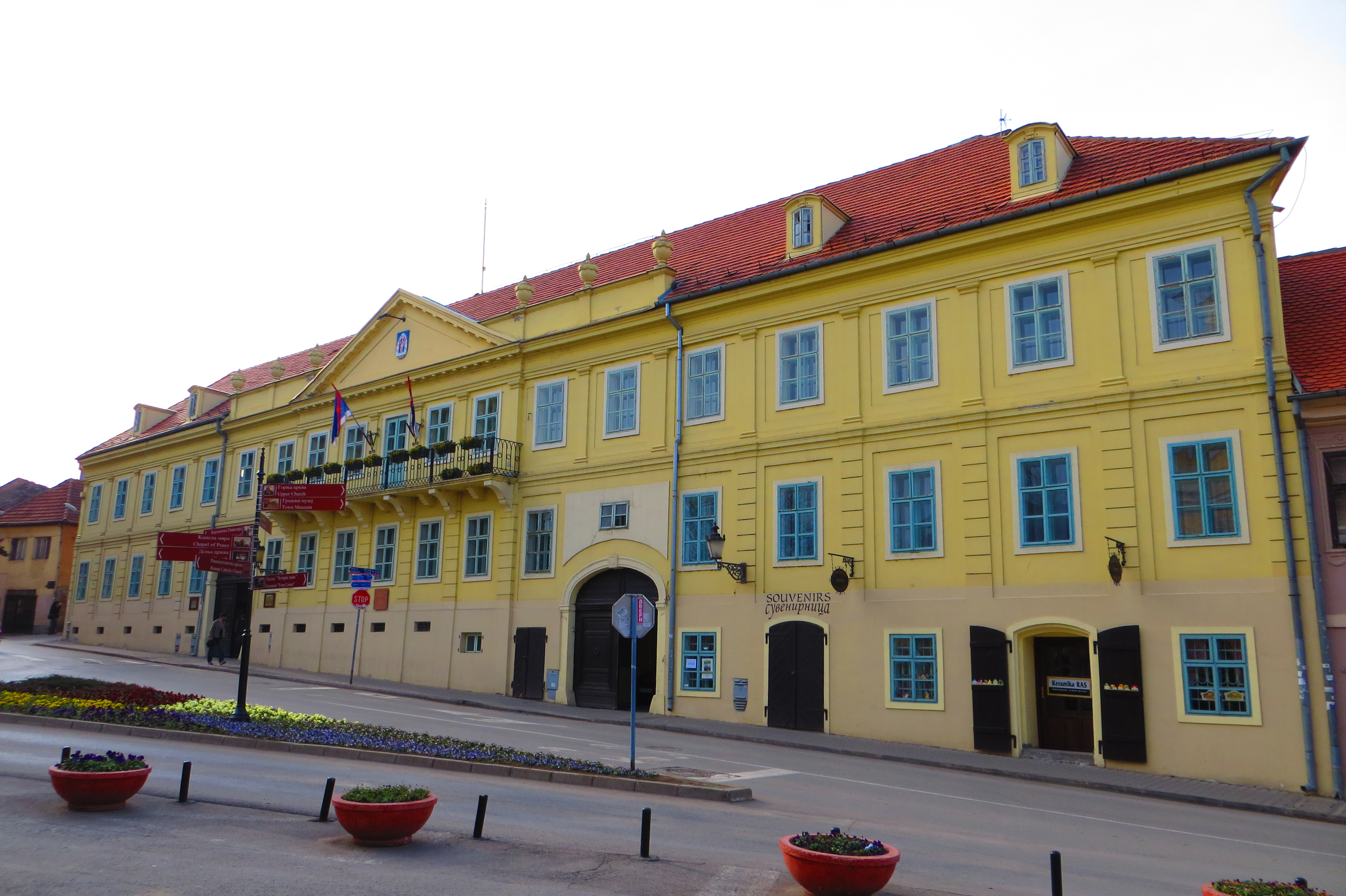
- Sremski Karlovci Town Hall

General information
- Type: City hall
- Architectural style: Neoclassicism
- Location: Sremski Karlovci, Serbia, Trg Branka Radičevića 1
- Current tenants: Sremski Karlovci municipality
- Construction started: 1808
- Completed: 1811
- Renovated: 2005

Sremski Karlovci Town Hall is located at the center of Sremski Karlovci, Serbia. Town hall was built in the period between 1808 and 1811 in the neoclassicism style. It was constructed to be garrison of the nearby Petrovaradin fortress in Novi Sad, and later it became a military building. Above the balcony is a coat of arms of Sremski Karlovci.

== History ==
The most important event that occurred in this building is declaration of Serbian Vojvodina from a balcony by Josif Rajačić in May 1848, known in Serbia as May Assembly, during European Revolutions of 1848. In this building the temporary government of Serbian Vojvodina was organized and was called The Main National Council. The first capital of Serbian Vojvodina was in Sremski Karlovci, so city hall was also the Serbian Vojvodina main government building.

The town hall nowadays houses municipal administration, including town council and police.
