= Four Lions Fountain =

Fountain in Sremski Karlovci, Serbia

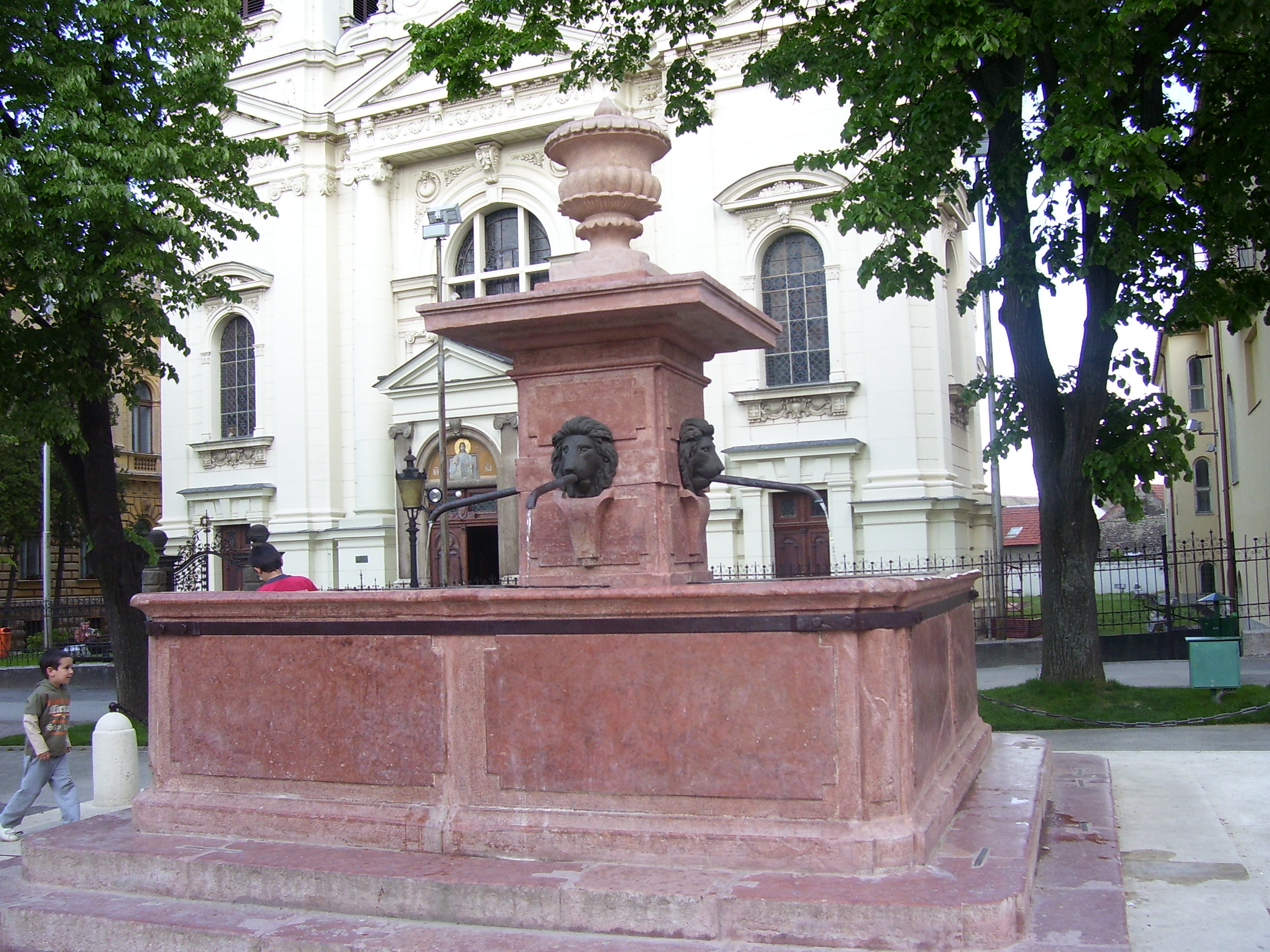
Fountain "Four Lions" after reconstruction

Fountain "Four Lions" (Serbian: Чесма "Четири лава", Česma "Četiri lava") in Sremski Karlovci, Serbia, is located at Branko Radičević Square, the main square of the town.

It was built in 1799, as a crown of the first town waterworks. The leading architect was an Italian, Giuseppe Aprili, who designed this fountain in baroque style, from red marble. Since that time the fountain has become the symbol of Karlovci. There is an interesting legend about the fountain, which says that everyone who drinks water from it will return to Karlovci and get married.

The fountain was completely renovated in 2007, thanks to the donation of Professor Miodrag Radulovacki.

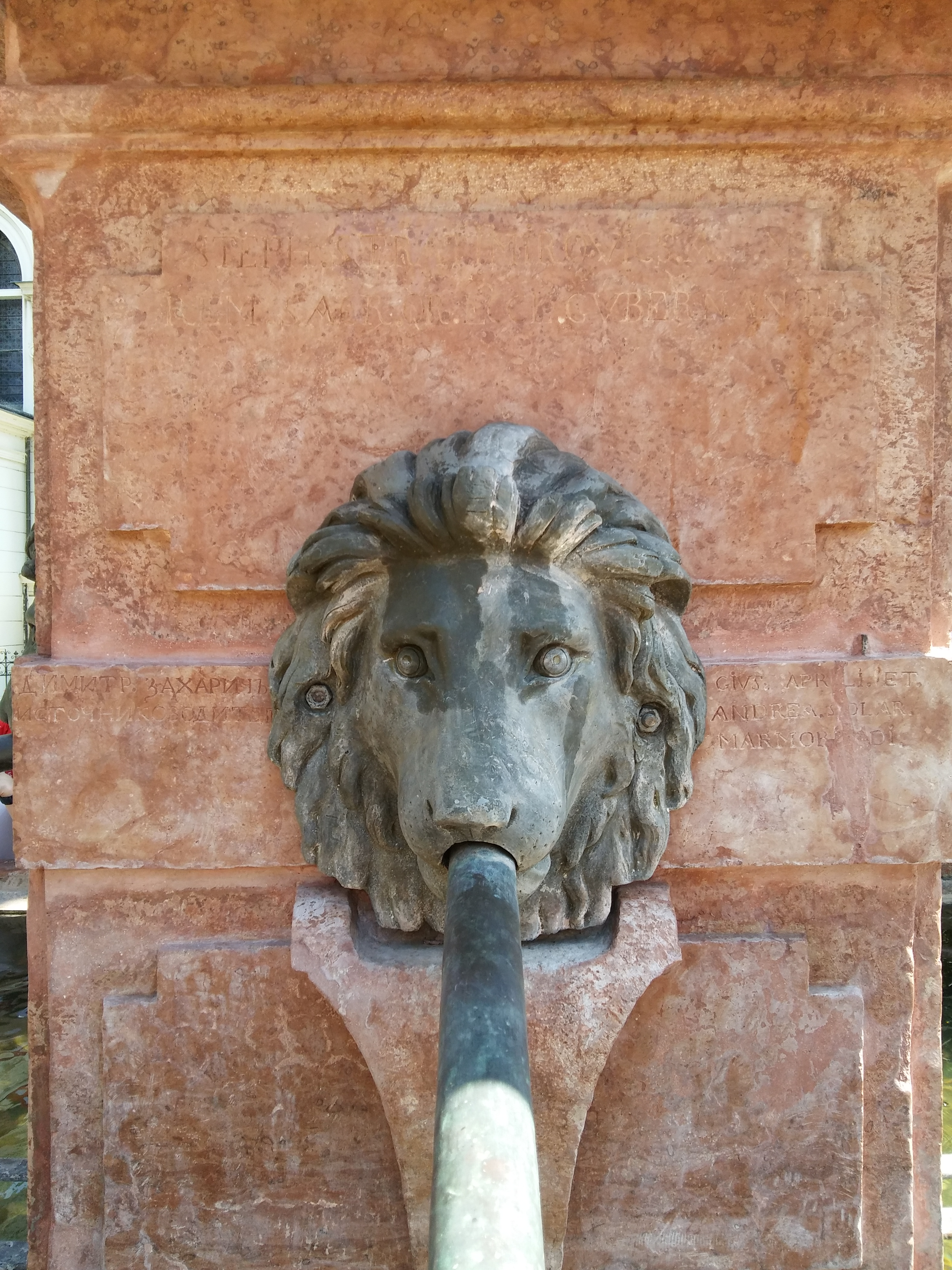
Four Lions Fountain in Sremski Karlovci

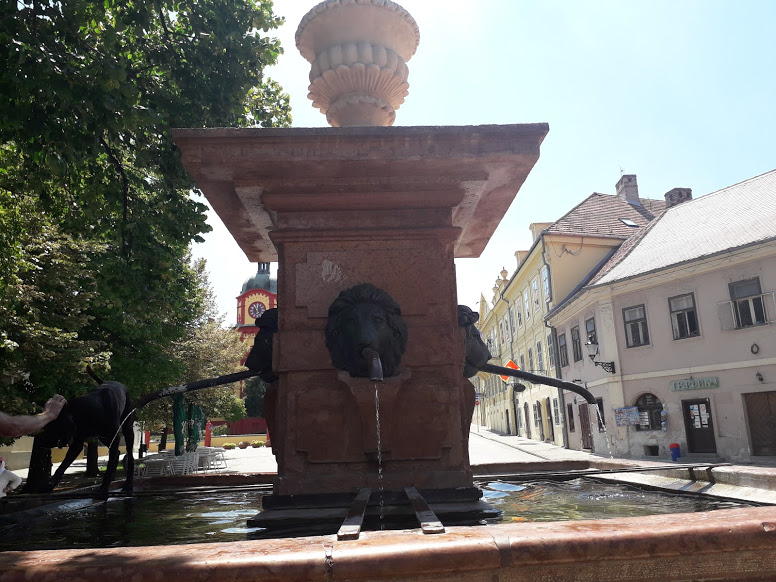
Four Lions Fountain in Sremski Karlovci

== See also ==
- Sremski Karlovci
