= Treaty of Karlowitz =

1699 treaty ending the Great Turkish War

Peace of Karlowitz
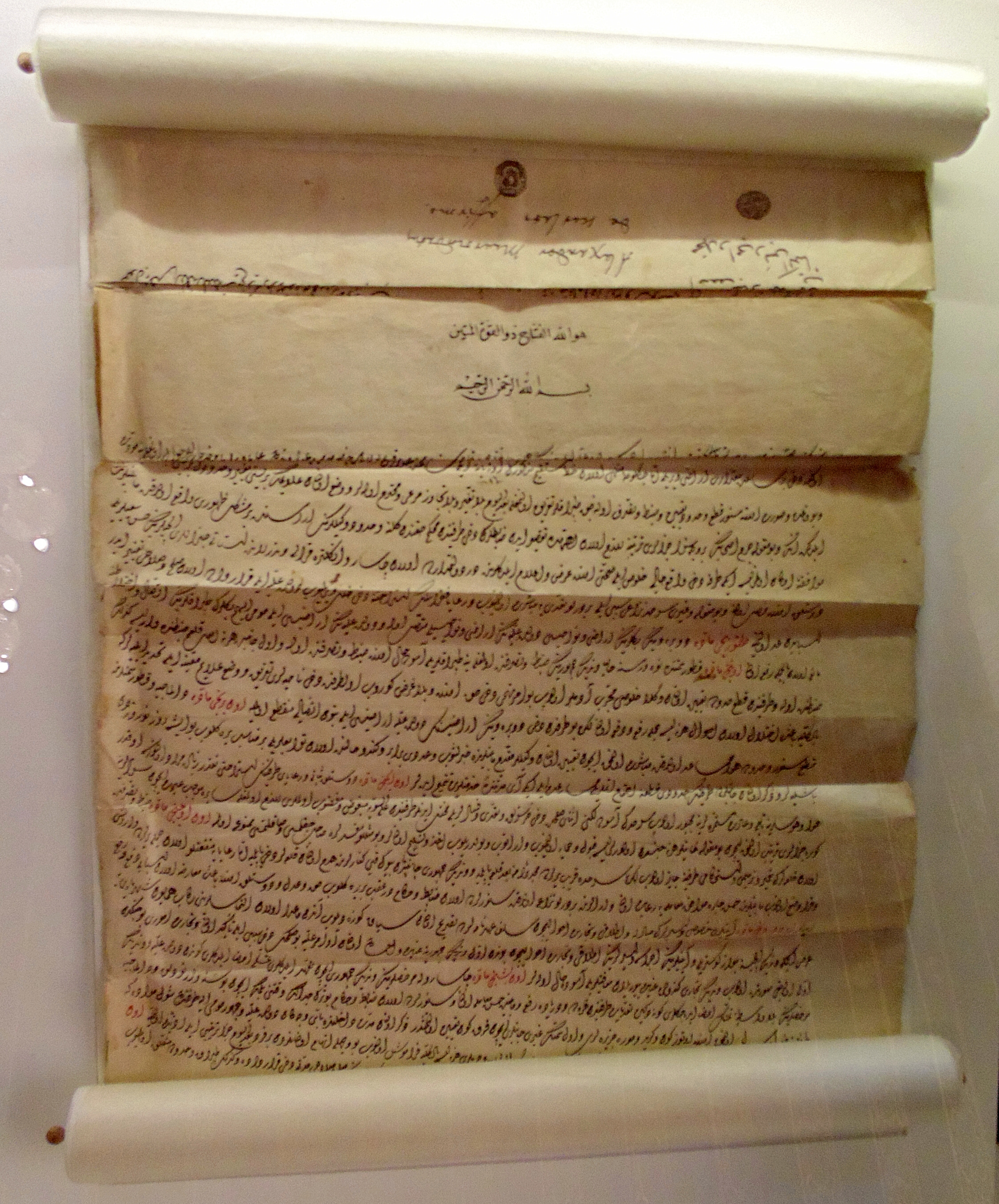
- The official document of the treaty
- Context: Great Turkish War of 1683–1699
- Drafted: From 16 November 1698
- Signed: 26 January 1699
- Location: Karlowitz, Military Frontier, Habsburg monarchy (now Sremski Karlovci, Serbia)
- Signatories: (Ottoman Empire) Rami Mehmed Pasha (Reis ül-Küttab); (Ottoman Empire) Alex. Mavrocordatos (Dragoman of the Porte); (Holy Roman Empire) Count Kinsky; (Holy Roman Empire) Count Oettingen; (Holy Roman Empire) Leopold Schlick; (Republic of Venice) Carlo Ruzzini; Stanisław Małachowski; (Russia) Prokofy Voznitsyn
- Parties: Dutch Republic (mediators); Kingdom of England (mediators); Ottoman Empire; Holy Roman Empire; Poland–Lithuania; Republic of Venice; Papal States; Tsardom of Russia (truce)
- Languages: Latin (HRE and Turkey); Ottoman Turkish (Venice and Turkey)

The Treaty of Karlowitz, concluding the Great Turkish War of 1683–1699, in which the Ottoman Empire was defeated by the Holy League at the Battle of Zenta, was signed in Karlowitz (present-day Sremski Karlovci, Serbia), in the Military Frontier of the Habsburg Monarchy, on 26 January 1699. Also known as "The Austrian treaty that saved Europe", it marks the end of Ottoman control in much of Central Europe, with their first major territorial losses in Europe, beginning the reversal of almost four centuries of expansion (1299–1683). The treaty established the Habsburg monarchy as the dominant power of the region.

== Context and terms ==
Following a two-month congress between the Ottoman Empire on one side, and the Holy League of 1684– a coalition of the Holy Roman Empire (HRE), the Polish–Lithuanian Commonwealth, the Republic of Venice, and Peter the Great, the tsar of Russia, a peace treaty was signed on 26 January 1699.

On the basis of uti possidetis, the treaty confirmed the territorial holdings of each power. The Habsburgs received from the Ottomans the Eğri Eyalet, Varat Eyalet, much of the Budin Eyalet, the northern part of the Temeşvar Eyalet, and parts of the Bosnia Eyalet. That corresponded to much of Hungary, Croatia, and Slavonia. The Principality of Transylvania remained nominally independent, but was subject to the direct rule of Austrian governors.

Among many other things, the treaty concluded between the Holy Roman Emperor and King of Germany Leopold I (a Habsburg) and the Ottoman Sultan that ended the war included provisions for the maintenance of Catholic churches and the Christian faith in the nearby Ottoman territories. They also included details on dealing with Ottoman subject populations which picked different sides near the border territories and riverine trade on the borders:

Whereas during this War many Hungarians and Transylvanians withdrew from their Subjection to his Imperial Majesty to the Frontiers of the Sublime Ottoman Porte, and are to be taken care of in a due manner by the Treaty now concluded between both Empires, 'tis stipulated that they shall live in Freedom and Security in the Dominions of the said Empire. […] And whereas hereafter they are to be reckon’d among the other Subjects of the most Potent Emperor of the Turks, it shall not be lawful for them ever to withdraw from his Subjection any more; and if they offer to return to their own Country, they shall be deem’d Malecontents, and shall have no Shelter nor Support from the Germans, but when apprehended, shall be deliver’d to the Turkish Governors of the Frontiers, for the greater Security of the Peace on both sides. […] The Use of the Rivers Marosche and Teysse, between the Province of Temesvaer and the Provinces subject to the Emperor’s Power and Possession, shall be common to the Subjects of both Empires, whether for watering of Cattle of all sorts, or for Fishing, or other Conveniences necessary for the Subjects. And whereas Ships of Burden bound from the Parts abovemention’d, subject to the Imperial Dominion, either in passing or repassing thro’ the River Marosche to the River Teysse, or thro’ the Teysse to the Danube, ought not to meet with any Obstruction; the Navigation of the German Ships, or of any others which are subject to the Emperor, shall by no means be disturb’d in their Passage to and fro, but the same shall be freely and commodiously carry’d on every where in both the said Rivers: and for the preservation of a reciprocal Friendship and Good-will, the Subjects of the Ottoman Porte shall share the conveniencies of the said rivers, […]

The Polish–Lithuanian Commonwealth recovered Podolia with the undestroyed fortress at Kamianets-Podilskyi (although the fortress in Kamianets was not recaptured in the 1698 campaign). Therefore, the areas that were lost 27 years earlier in the Treaty of Buchach in 1672 were regained. In return, the Polish–Lithuanian Commonwealth gave back captured fortresses in Moldova. The treaty also assumed the release of prisoners, the displacement of the Buda Tatars from Moldova, the end of Tatar raids, the rendition of fugitives (Cossacks to the Commonwealth, Moldovans to the Ottomans), and the cessation of tribute payments by the commonwealth. The Commonwealth never again had a military conflict with the Ottomans.

Venice obtained most of Dalmatia, along with the Morea (the Peloponnese peninsula of southern Greece), though the Morea was restored to the Turks within 20 years by the Treaty of Passarowitz. There was no agreement about the Holy Sepulchre, although it was discussed in Karlowitz.

The Ottomans retained Belgrade, the Banat of Temesvár (now Timișoara), as well as suzerainty over Wallachia and Moldavia. Negotiations with the Tsardom of Russia went on for a further year, under a truce agreed at Karlowitz, and culminated in the Treaty of Constantinople of 1700, in which the Sultan ceded the Azov region to Peter the Great. (Russia had to return the territories eleven years later after the failed Pruth River Campaign and the Treaty of the Pruth in 1711.)

Commissions were set-up to demarcate the new borders between the Austrians and the Ottomans, with some parts disputed until 1703. Largely through the efforts of the Habsburg commissioner Luigi Ferdinando Marsili, the Croatian and Bihać borders were agreed-upon by mid-1700, and the borders at Temesvár by early 1701, leading to a border that was marked by physical landmarks for the first time.

The acquisition of around 60,000 square miles (160,000 km^{2}) of Hungarian territories at Karlowitz, and of the Banat of Temesvár 18 years later by the Treaty of Passarowitz, made the Habsburg monarchy the dominant regional power in Central Europe.

The treaty was a watershed moment in the history of the Ottoman Empire, which, for the first time, lost substantial amounts of territory after three-and-a-half centuries of expansion in Europe. Although the Ottoman borders in the region would wax and wane over the next 100 years, there was no further acquisition of territory on a scale seen during the reigns of Mehmed the Conqueror, Selim the Grim, or Suleiman the Magnificent in the 15th-16th centuries. Indeed, after the mid-1700s, the Ottomans were largely confined to the south of the Sava River and the Balkans proper.

== Ukraine ==
The treaty was supposed to secure the Ottoman–Commonwealth borders, and bring them perpetual peace. The Sejm of the Commonwealth therefore concluded that the Cossack regiments on the Right Bank were no longer necessary. Instead, the szlachta – the Polish–Lithuanian (and Ruthenian) nobility – wanted to exploit the vast post-war economic opportunities by acquiring landholdings and establishing noble estates in the now-peaceful voivodeships of Podolia, Bratslav and southern Kyiv, and to enserf the Ruthenian (Ukrainian) peasants there for their own benefit. The szlachta-dominated Sejm therefore passed a highly controversial resolution in June 1669, which stipulated the Liquidation of Cossackdom in Right-bank Ukraine (1699). The entire regimental system as well as the Right-bank hetmancy was to be abolished, Cossack soldiers lost their payment and had to leave the Right Bank.

All these factors would become the primary cause of the Paliy uprising (1700/1702–1704) against the szlachta, which engulfed Right-bank Ukraine precisely during the Swedish invasion of Poland (1701–1706) and subsequent Civil war in Poland (1704–1706). The situation led to the intervention of Ivan Mazepa of the Left-bank Cossack Hetmanate, who occupied all of Ukraine from the Dnipro up to and including Lviv in 1704–1705, becoming de facto Hetman of Both Banks under Muscovite protection until 1708/1709.

== Maps and images ==
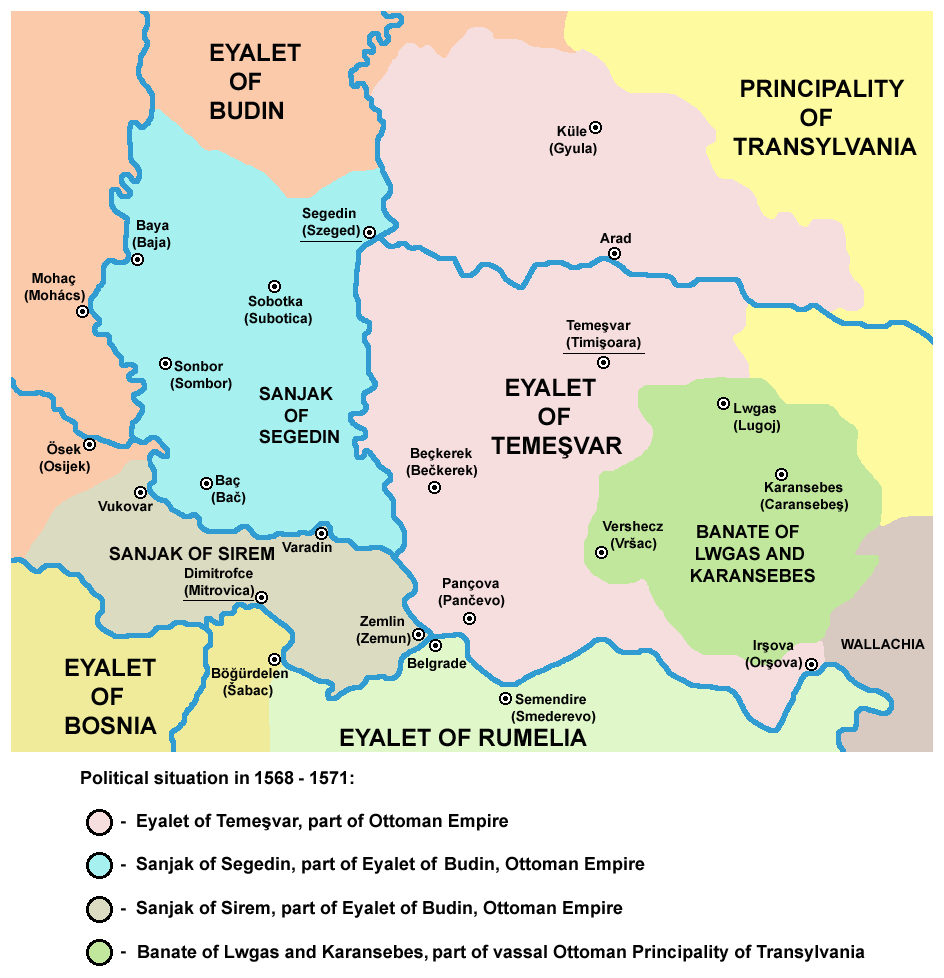
Political situation in 1568–71, before the treaty. All territories shown are Ottoman eyalets or vassals.

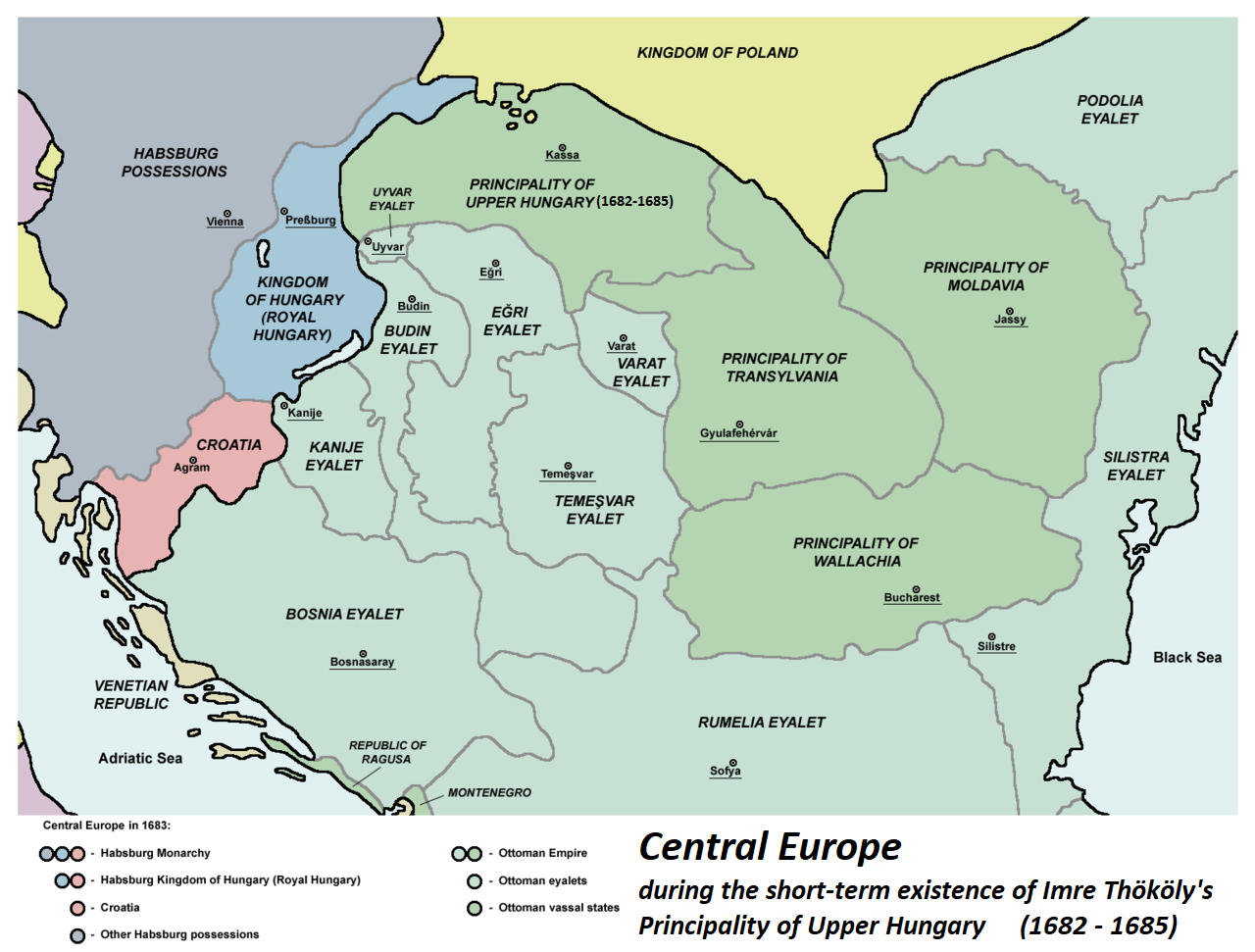
Central Europe in 1683, before the treaty:
Habsburg Empire
Ottoman Empire

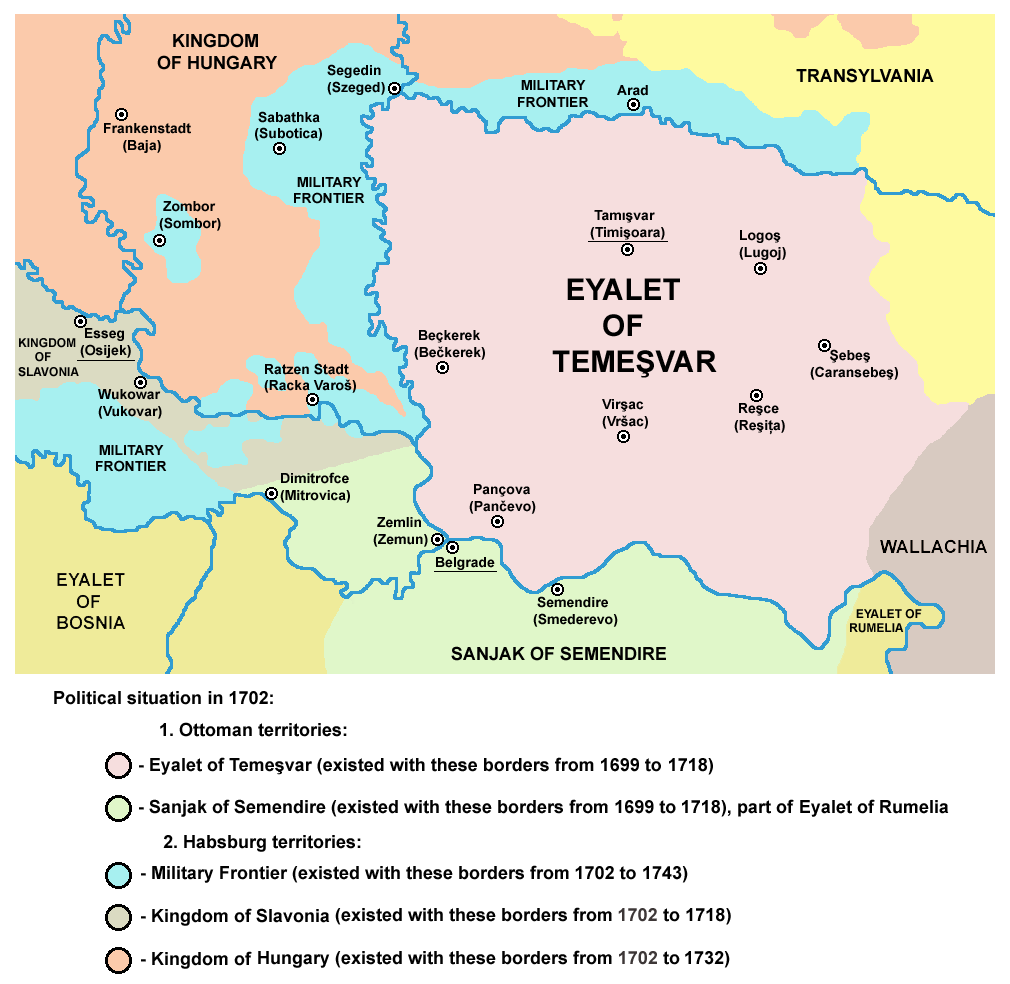
Balkan political situation in 1699, after the treaty:
Habsburg Empire
Ottoman Empire

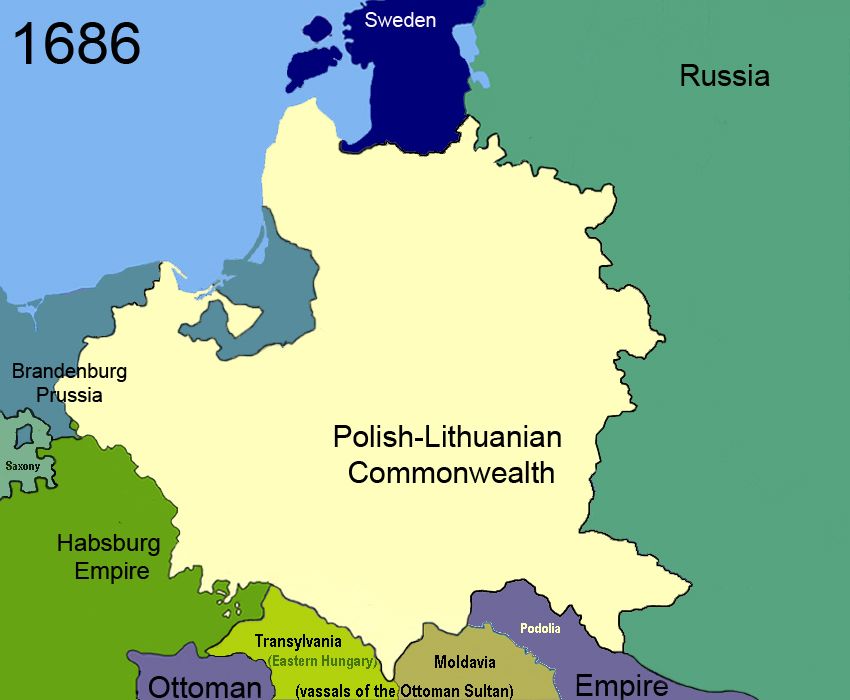
The Polish–Lithuanian Commonwealth in 1686, before the treaty

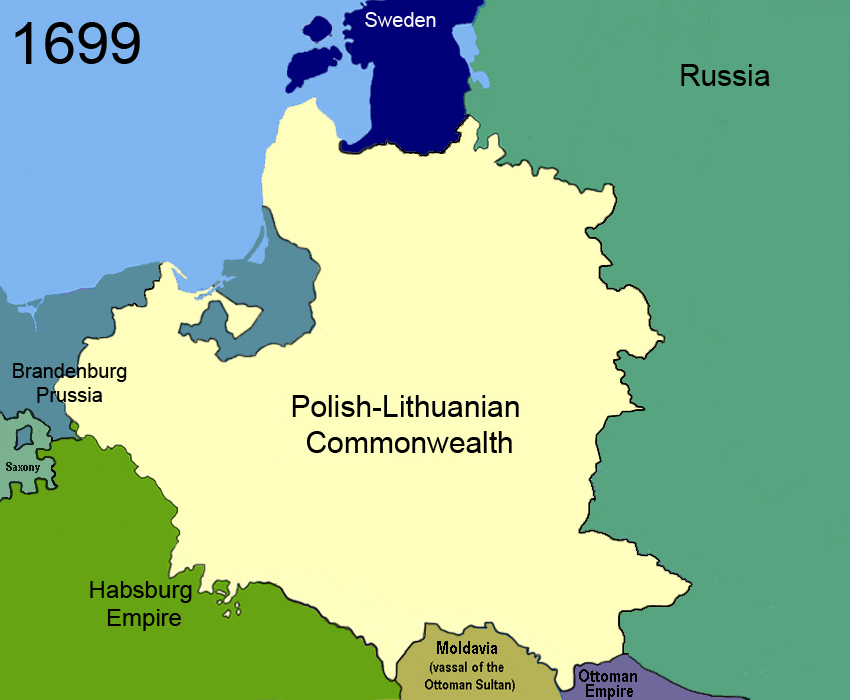
The Polish–Lithuanian Commonwealth in 1699, after the treaty. Note the Ottoman loss of territory at the bottom of the map.

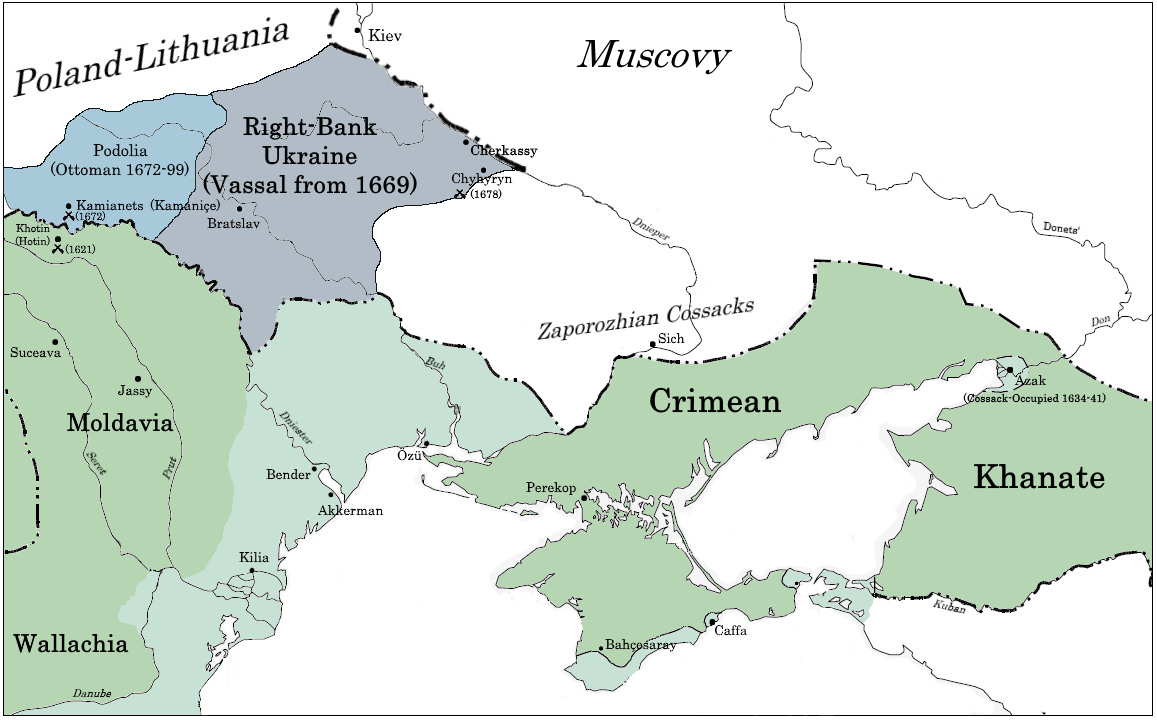
Podolia and Right-bank Ukraine, renounced by the Ottomans in 1699

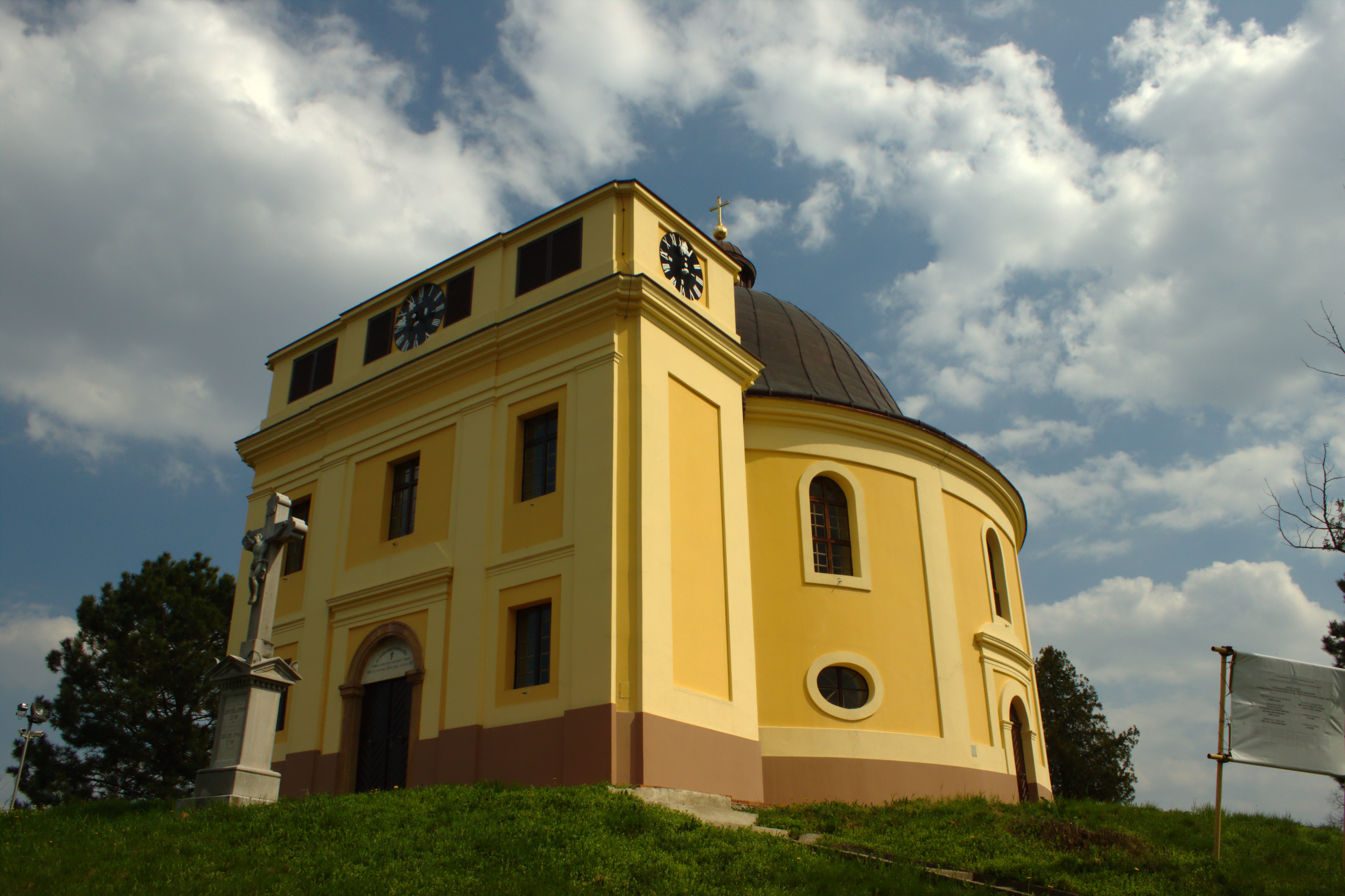
Chapel of Peace, where the Treaty of Karlowitz was negotiated

== See also ==
- Great Migrations of the Serbs
