= Church of the Assumption of the Theotokos, Vršac =

Orthodox Church in Vojvodina, Serbia

Church of the Assumption
- Црква ваведења пресвете Богородице
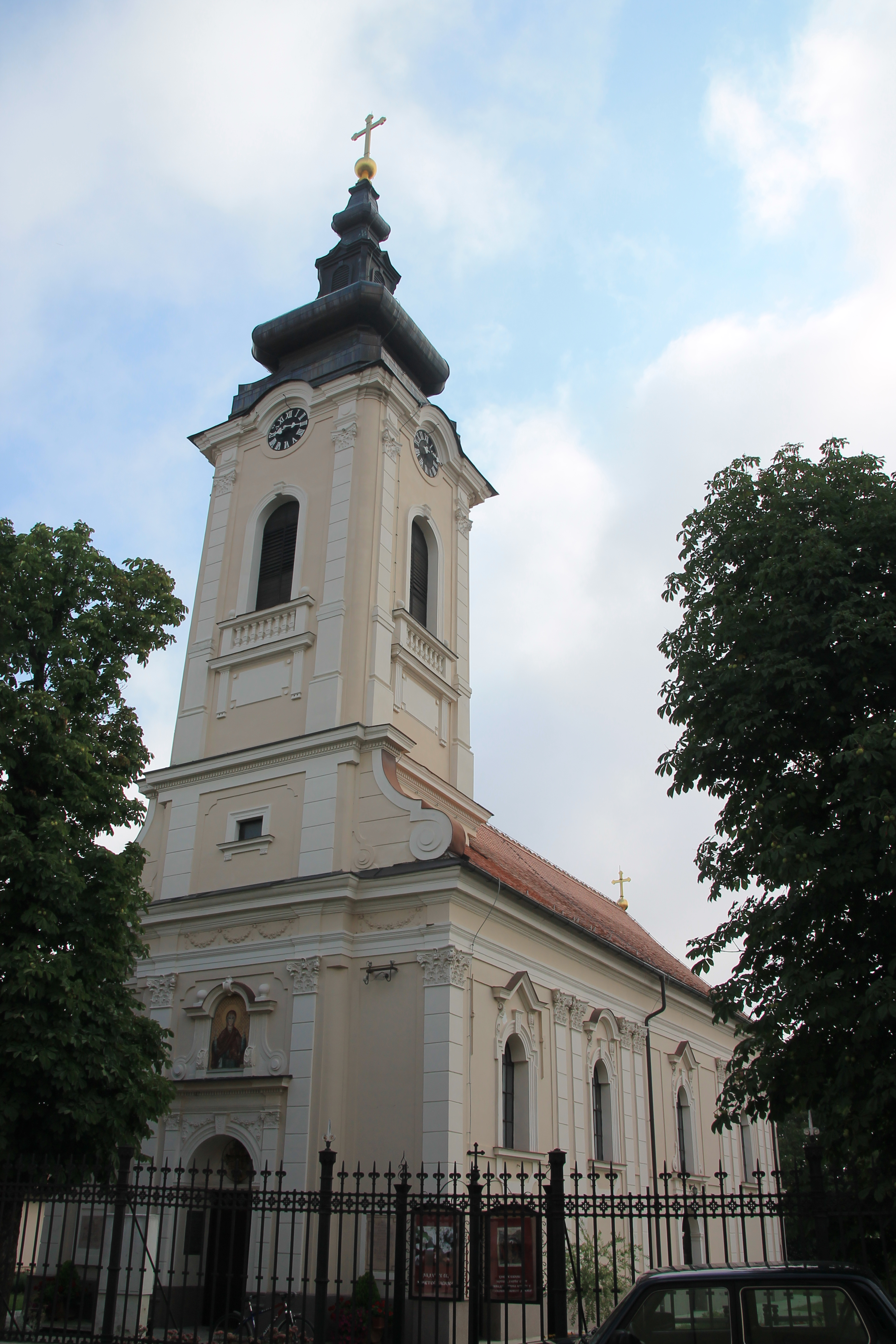
- Church of the Assumption of the Theotokos
- Church of the Assumption
- 45°07′01″N 21°17′24″E
- Location: Vršac, Vojvodina
- Country: Serbia
- Denomination: Serbian Orthodox

History
- Status: Church
- Dedication: Assumption of Mary

Architecture
- Functional status: Active
- Years built: 1761-1768

Administration
- Archdiocese: Eparchy of Banat

The Church of the Assumption of the Theotokos (Serbian: Црква успења пресвете Богородице) in Vršac is Serbian Orthodox church in Vojvodina, Serbia. It is commonly referred to as Mala crkva (Little Church) and Aleksina crkva (Aleksa's Church). Aleksa Nikolić from the name was a merchant from Vršac who funded the building of the church.

The treasury of this church houses two Gospels of significant historical value. The first was printed in Moscow in 1762 and was gifted by Aleksa Nikolić, while the second was presented to the church by Bishop Jovan Georgijević. The oldest parish record dates from 1767.

== History ==
The building was constructed between 1761 and 1768 under Bishop Jovan Georgijević and consecrated in 1775 by Bishop Vikentije Popović. Iconostasis of the church was painted between 1792 and 1809 by Arsenije Arsa Teodorović, woodcarving by Pantelejmon Nikolajević and the most recent wall icons by Karel Napravnik in 1946 after the end of World War II in Yugoslavia. By installation of a metal fence in 1868, the temple received its final present appearance.

== See also ==
- Eparchy of Banat
- Church of St. Nicholas, Vršac
- Romanian Orthodox Cathedral, Vršac
- Church of the Assumption of the Theotokos, Pančevo
