= Središte =

Središte may refer to:

- Središte monastery, a monastery in Serbia
- Malo Središte, a village in Serbia
- Veliko Središte, a village in Serbia
