= Ilarion Radonić =

Ilarion Radonić (worldly name: Žarko Radonić; 27 August 1871 - 4 March 1932) was bishop of the Serbian Orthodox Church.

== Biography ==
Žarko Radonić was born in Mol, Bačka, on 27 August 1871. After graduating from the Gymnasium in Novi Sad, he enrolled in the Faculty of Theology at the Grandes écoles of Saint Arsenije in Sremski Karlovci and, after graduating, studied law in Eger and Pest. As a graduate theologian and lawyer, he moved to Bosnia and Herzegovina and became a professor at the Faculty of Theology in Reljevo in Sarajevo. At the beginning of 1900, he took over the editorial board of the Church magazine Istočnik, which he edited with great success. He did editorial work for more than seven years (from January 1, 1900, to September 30, 1907). As an editor, Radonić himself was a prolific writer. His most numerous works were editorials and reviews of magazines and books, but most often works from the history of the Serbian Orthodox Church, ancient and modern literature, and books published by Matica srpska. He also published speeches, commemorative sermons, and articles on pastoral practice. During his tenure as editor, a significant number of the works by Russian theologians were translated and published. In his senior years, he attended world inter-faith conferences.

== Monastic life ==
He was ordained to the rank of deacon, and to the rank of presbyter on October 11, 1899. He became the rector of his alma mater (Grandes écoles of Saint Arsenije Sremac in Sremski Karlovci) in 1909. He published his works in "Istočnik", which he edited with great success.

He was elected Metropolitan of the Eparchy of Zvornik and Tuzla by the Holy Synod of the Patriarchate of Constantinople on 14 December 1909 and was consecrated in Tuzla on 15 May 1910. In 1914 he was Chairman of the Great Administrative and Educational Council, and after the First World War, he became a member of the Central Bishops' Council, which made all preparations for the establishment of a united Serbian Patriarchate.

He moved to the Diocese of Caransebeș which was under the authority of the Serbian Orthodox Church, on 6 April 1922 and remained there until 1929 when he retired due to illness. He died in Osijek on 4 March 1932 and was buried in the city cemetery.

Eastern Orthodox Church titles
| Preceded by Nikanor Popović | Metropolitan of Zvornik and Tuzla; 1909–1922 | Succeeded by Nektarije Krulj |
| Preceded by Gavrilo Zmejanović | Bishop of Vršac; 1922–1929 | Vacant Title next held by Georgije Letić as Bishop of Banat |
