= Gavrilo Zmejanović =

Bishop of the Serbian Orthodox Church (1847-1932)

Gavrilo Zmejanović (Serbian Cyrillic: Гаврило Змејановић; 25 August 1847 – 14 October 1932) was a bishop of the Serbian Orthodox Church and an unconfirmed Serbian Patriarch.

== Life ==
Gavrilo Zmejanović was born on 25 August 1847 in Dobanovci in Srem, to father Mihailo, a priest, and mother Eva - née Andrejević. He finished elementary Serbian school and civic German school, then High School of Karlovci and the Serbian Orthodox Seminary of Sremski Karlovci. He then graduated from the Faculty of Economics in Altenburg, Germany. From 1870 to 1882 he studied economics and natural sciences. In 1876, he fought as a Serbian volunteer-insurgent on the Drina and he was one of the chat leaders. He returned home, wounded. This was later taken as evil by the Serb haters.

== Monastic life ==
Zmejanović became a monk at the invitation of Serbian Patriarch Herman Andjelic, in 1882 in the Krusedol monastery. He became a Deacon on 19 November 1882, and the next day a Presbyter. From 1882 to 1891 he was a military priest, a "soul guardian" of Bosnian-Herzegovinian troops. At that time, he was engaged in theological sciences, and in Sarajevo, taught religious education. He was praised and awarded the right to wear a red belt for his work with Sarajevo's youth. Austrian Emperor Franz Joseph I awarded him the Golden Cross with a crown for his educational work. In 1891, Patriarch Georgije (Branković) entrusted him with the administration of the Krušedol monastery. In those years, he befriended another from his childhood, the poet Laza Kostić, who studied at the monastery (1896). At that time, the Parliamentary Committee entrusted Zmejanović to supervise church (until 1895). He became the Archimandrite of the Monastery of Krušedol on 25 March 1894, and in 1895 became the Mandatary of the vacant Diocese of Vršac.

== Bishop of Vršac ==
Zmejanović was elected Bishop of Vršac on 18 May 1896, which was confirmed by the Austrian ruler on 14 June 1896. He was consecrated as Bishop on 27 July that year in the Karlovac Cathedral by Serbian Patriarch Mihailo (Jovanović) of Upper Karlovac. During the time of Bishop Gavrilo, the bishop's court in Vršac was built to its present appearance and was supplied with appropriate furnishings. While sitting in the episcopal chair, Zmejanović was at enmity with the Vršac radicals, who condemned him through their newspapers for his "Hungarianness" and derisively called him "Gabor" instead of Gavrilo. On the first day of Pentecost in 1898, Mita Popović from Vršac allegedly tried to assassinate a bishop who went to church in full force. He later changed camp and (from a clergyman to a radical) in 1899, together with the radical leaders, he accused Patriarch Georgije Branković of financial damage to church communities, protopresbyters, and monasteries. At the beginning of 1901, Zmejanović took a long leave of absence from the Serbian patriarch for treatment and recovery.

Zmejanović played "devil's advocate" to ingratiate himself with the Habsburg Court in order to improve the living conditions of his flock (Serbs, Romanians, and Greeks alike). He and his successors (Georgije Letić and Ilarion Zeremski) all performed this role.

== Unconfirmed Serbian Patriarch ==
Zmejanović was active in the Parliamentary Committee in Karlovac, which he chaired for a period. He was close to the Serbian radicals in Hungary; he played a political role, he criticized and was criticized. In 1902, accountability was demanded by the Synod of Bishops. Zmejanović is credited with passing the so-called "Monastery Ordinances" by the Serbian Church-People's Assembly in 1902. On 1 August 1908, the Serbian Church Council in Karlovac unanimously elected him Patriarch of Serbia. The public in Austro-Hungary rose up against his election, newspapers attacked him and wrote unfavorably, claiming that his election was a "great-Serbian act". Due to that, Emperor Franz Joseph did not confirm him. He was the third Serbian Patriarch, after Stojković and Živković. In 1911, in order to establish his Endowment, he handed over 100,000 crowns to the Church Parliamentary Committee. He intended them for the establishment of a school for Serbian female farmers.

During the First World War, Zmejanović fell ill and declined. He retired in 1920, and resided in the Srem monastery Bešenovo. After a serious illness, he died on 14 October 1932 in Zemun Polje at the home of his son Miloš Zmejanović. He was buried in the family tomb in Grabovci, in Srem.

Eastern Orthodox Church titles
| Preceded by Nektarije Dimitrijević | Bishop of Vršac; 1896–1920 | Succeeded by Ilarion Radonić |
