= Monastery of St. Melania the Roman =

Monastery in Serbia

- Interactive map of Monastery of St. Melania the Roman

Monastery information
- Order: Serbian Orthodox
- Established: 1935
- Dedication: Melania the Younger (the Roman)
- Diocese: Eparchy of Banat

People
- Founder: Bishop Georgije Letić

Site
- Location: Zrenjanin, Serbia
- Coordinates: 45°23′37″N 20°24′53″E

The Monastery of St. Melania the Roman (Serbian: Манастир Свете Меланије Римљанке, Manastir Svete Melanije Rimljanke) is a Serbian Orthodox monastery located in the northeastern part of the city of Zrenjanin, in northern Serbia. It was founded in 1935 by the Bishop of Banat, Georgije Letić, built in the Byzantine ecclesiastical style. It was the first female monastery in Banat.

== See also ==
- List of Serbian Orthodox monasteries
