= Središte Monastery =

Monastery in Serbia

Coordinates: 45.144088°N 21.398237°E

Središte monastery
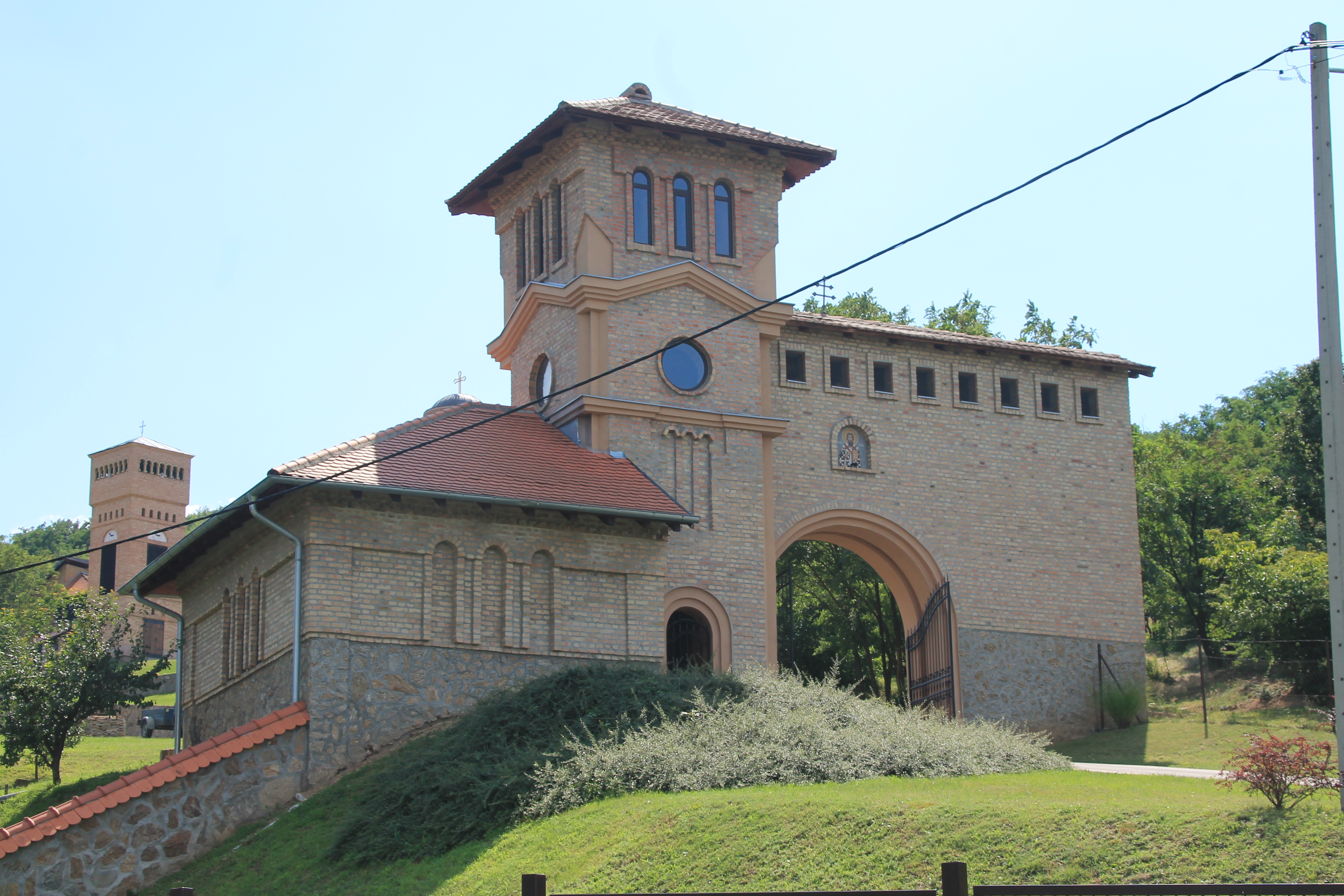
- Interactive map of Središte monastery

Monastery information
- Full name: Манастир - Средиште
- Order: Serbian Orthodox
- Diocese: Eparchy of Banat

Site
- Location: Veliko Središte

The Središte Monastery (Serbian: Манастир Средиште, romanized: Manastir Središte) is a Serb Orthodox monastery located in the Banat region, in the northern Serbian province of Vojvodina. The monastery is situated near the villages of Malo Središte and Veliko Središte, in the Vršac municipality. It was built in the late 15th century by Despot Jovan Brankovic.

== See also ==
- List of Serbian Orthodox monasteries
