= Bishop's Palace, Vršac =

Building in Vršac, Serbia

Bishop's Palace
- Владичански двор Vladičanski dvor
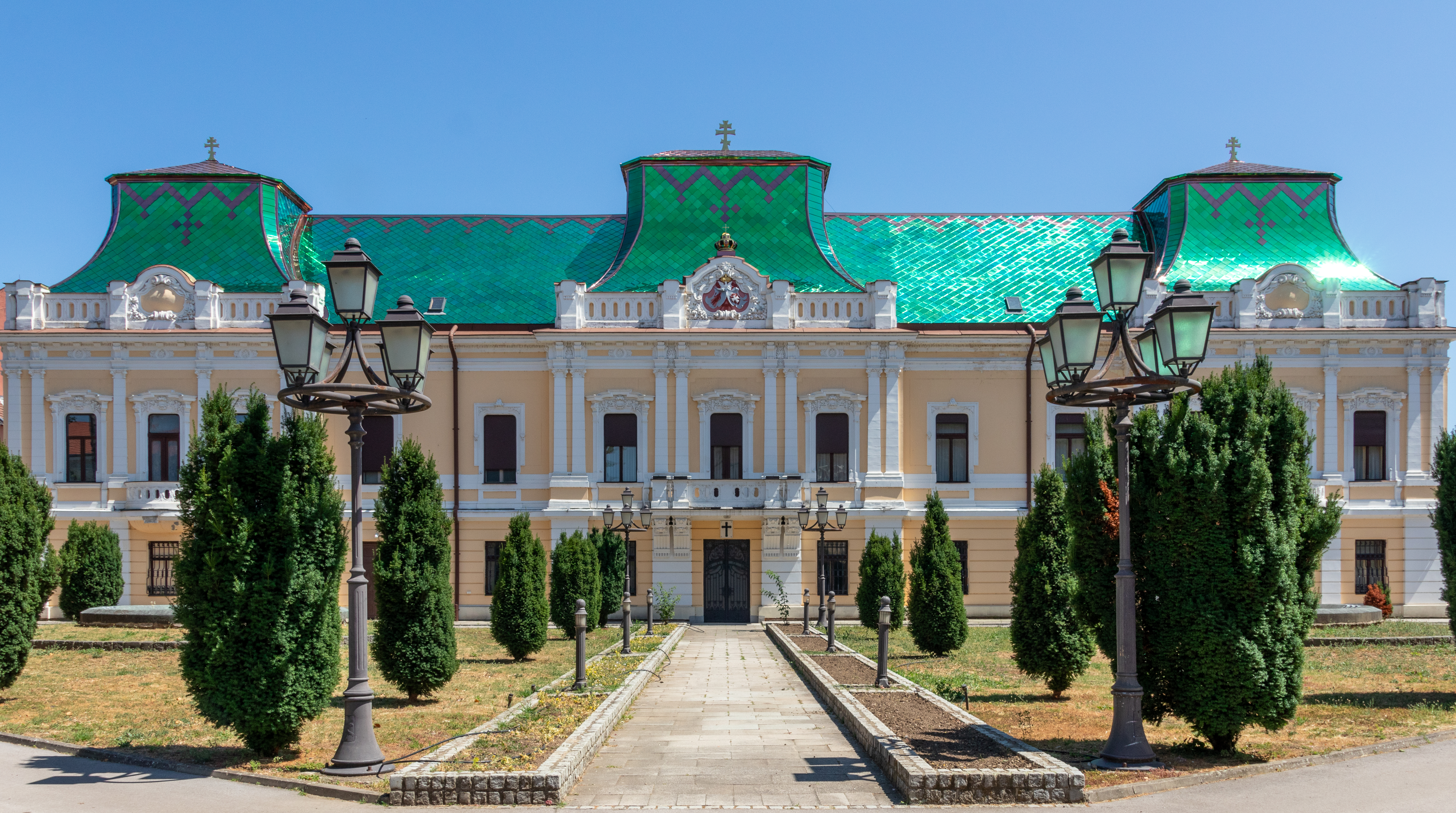
- Bishop's Palace, pictured in 2025
- Interactive map of the Bishop's Palace area

General information
- Architectural style: baroque
- Location: Vršac, Serbia
- Coordinates: 45.1190°N 21.2964°E
- Year built: 1750–1757

Design and construction
- Architect: unknown Prussian architect

The Bishop's Palace (Serbian: Владичански двор, romanized: Vladičanski dvor) is the seat and bishop's palace of the Eparchy of Banat of the Serbian Orthodox Church, located in Vršac, Serbia. The building is listed as the Cultural Heritage Site of Exceptional Importance.

The palace is the only baroque style ecclesiastical residence of the Serbian Orthodox Church. It houses valuable sacral objects such as 18th century iconostasis in its chapel on the second floor, as well as 14th century icon from Kyiv as well as 292 other icons and various 19th and early 20th century paintings.

== History ==
The building was constructed between 1750 and 1757 after the seat of the eparchy moved from Caransebeș in Romania where predominant Eastern Orthodox community became Romanian Orthodox, to then German and Serb inhabited Vršac. Both cities at the time were a part of the Austrian Empire. The name of the architect of the building in unknown today and the only known information is that he was from Prussia. In 1904, bishop Gavrilo Zmejanović carried out a major renovation that completely transformed the building's appearance. During this reconstruction, the entrance area was altered, and the roof was renovated. The simple Baroque design of the palace, characterized by symmetry and a rhythmic arrangement of windows, was enhanced by a prominent central risalit.

== See also ==
- Bishop's Palace, Novi Sad
- Bishop's Palace, Timișoara
- Palace of the Patriarchate, Sremski Karlovci
