= Saint Nicholas Cathedral, Vršac =

Cathedral in Vršac, Serbia

Saint Nicholas Cathedral
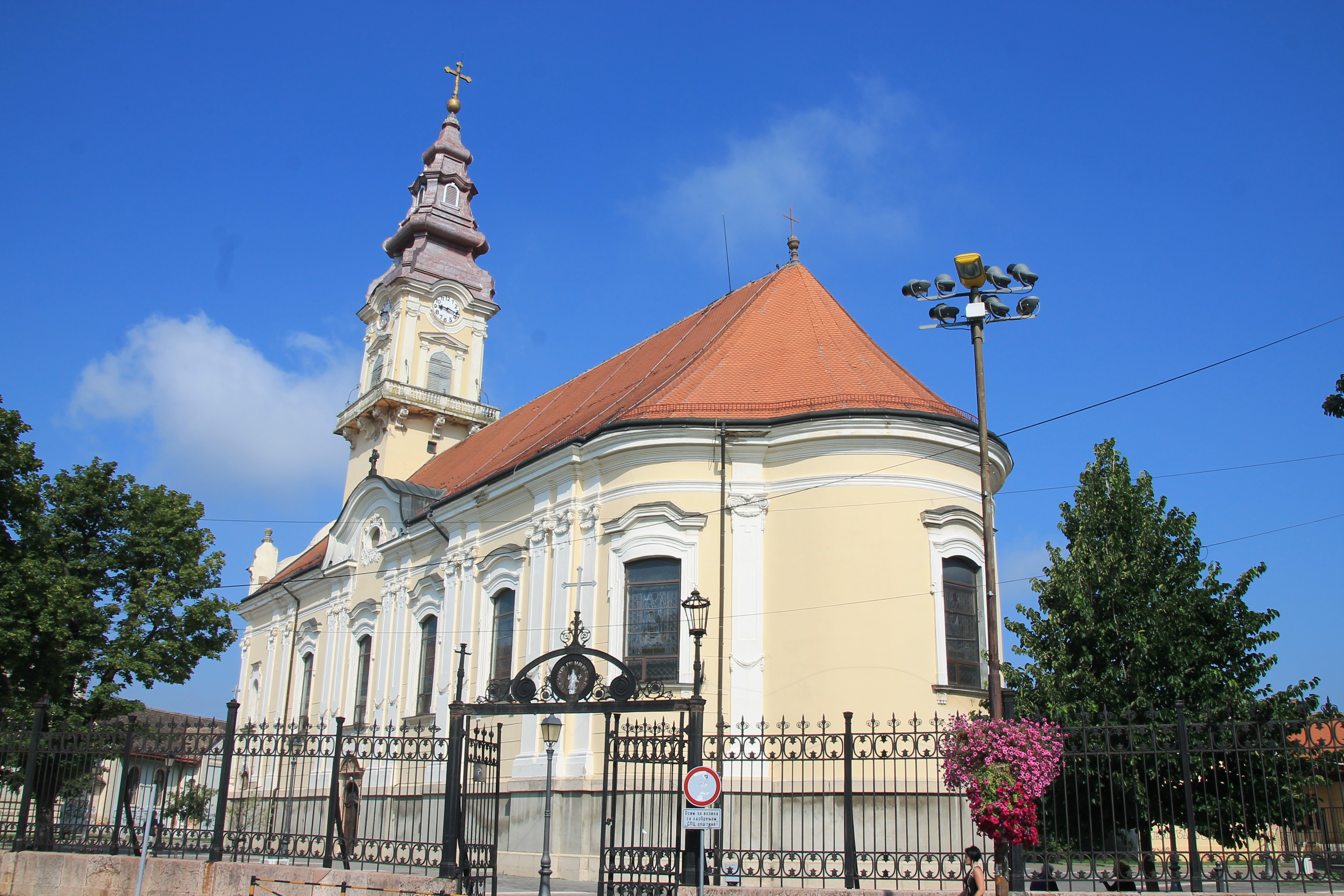
- Saint Nicholas Cathedral, pictured in 2020
- Saint Nicholas Cathedral
- 45°07′10″N 21°17′43″E
- Location: Vršac
- Country: Serbia
- Denomination: Serbian Orthodox Church

History
- Status: Church
- Dedication: Saint Nicholas

Architecture
- Functional status: Active
- Style: Neo-classicism
- Years built: 1785

Administration
- Archdiocese: Eparchy of Banat

The Saint Nicholas Cathedral (Serbian: Саборна црква Светог Николе, romanized: Saborna crkva Svetog Nikole) is an Eastern Orthodox church located in Vršac, Serbia. It is under jurisdiction of the Eparchy of Banat of the Serbian Orthodox Church and serves as its cathedral church.

== History ==
The church was built in 1785. The cathedral features a prominent iconostasis painted by Pavel Đurković and woodcarvings by Aksentije Marković. German painter St. G. Laufer restored the iconostasis from 1865 to 1868. Significant renovations have been undertaken multiple times, notably in 1909-1910, 1945, and 1968. The most recent renovations occurred from 2003 to 2007. The building contains a burial vault beneath the sanctuary where the earthly remains of bishops of Vršac and Banat are interred.

== See also ==
- Church of the Assumption of the Theotokos
- Cathedral of the Ascension of the Lord
- Church of Saint Gerhard de Sangredo
- List of cathedrals in Serbia
