= Church of the Assumption of the Theotokos, Pančevo =

Church in Vojvodina, Serbia

Church of the Assumption
- Црква ваведења пресвете Богородице
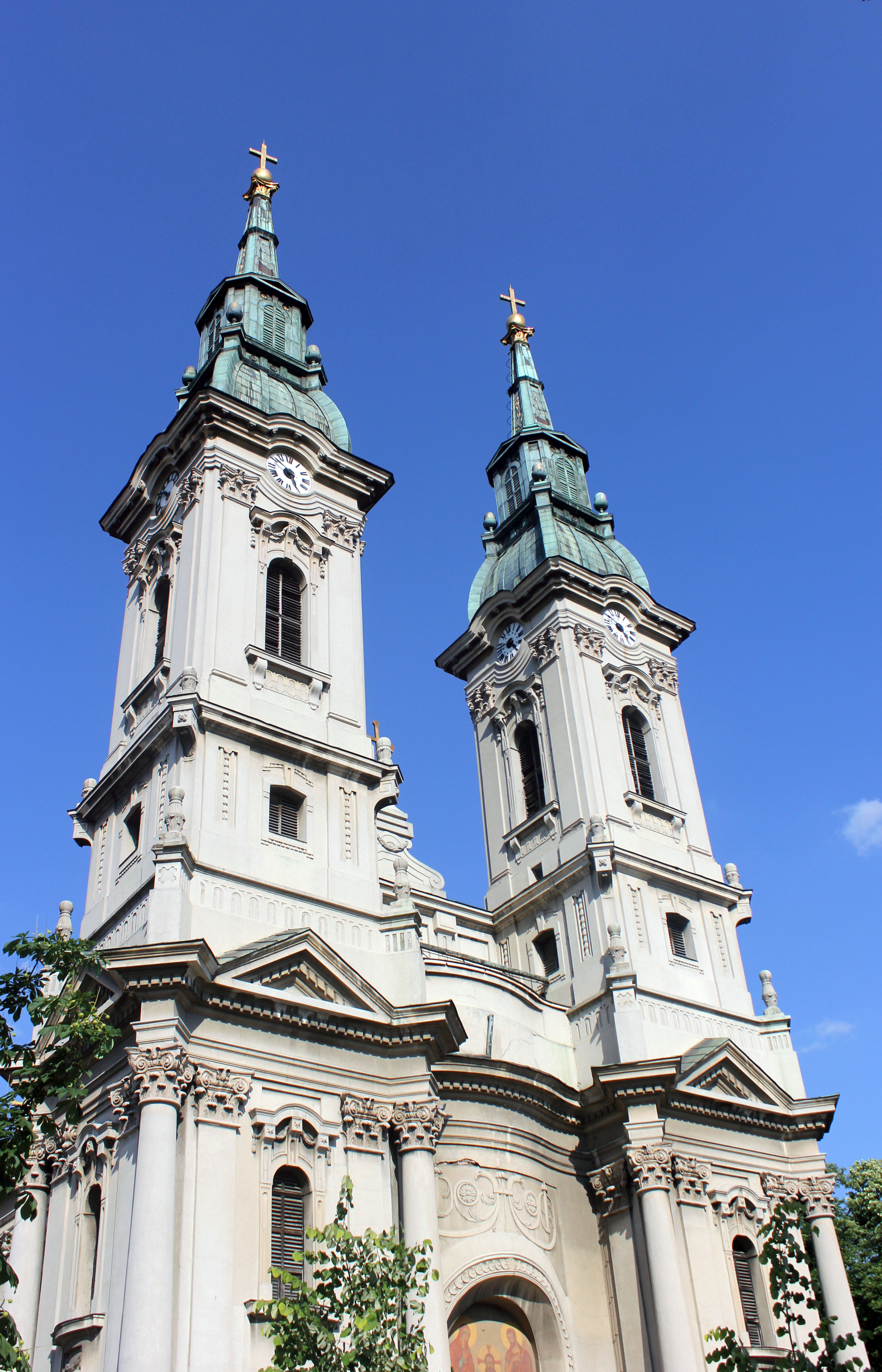
- Church of the Assumption of the Theotokos
- Church of the Assumption
- 44°52′20″N 20°38′19″E
- Location: Pančevo, Vojvodina

Cultural Heritage of Serbia
- Type: Cultural Monument of Great Importance
- Designated: 1997
- Reference no.: СК 1430
- Country: Serbia
- Denomination: Serbian Orthodox

History
- Status: Church
- Dedication: Assumption of Mary

Architecture
- Functional status: Active
- Years built: 1810

Administration
- Archdiocese: Eparchy of Banat

The Church of the Assumption of the Theotokos (Serbian: Црква успења пресвете Богородице) in Pančevo is Serbian Orthodox church in Vojvodina, Serbia. It is listed as a Monument of Great Cultural Importance by the Republic of Serbia. The church was built between 1801 and 1810 with contributions from local benefactors, among whom was Karađorđe Petrović, the leader of the First Serbian Uprising. The church was designed in a Baroque style with Classical elements. It features a monumental single-nave structure flanked by two bell towers. The iconostasis was painted by Konstantin Danil in the 19th century.

The western façade features a monumental portal and is dominated by two richly adorned bell towers, topped with a complex tin structure and a cross. According to the construction plan, these two towers symbolized the Serb people divided between two empires, the Austrian Empire and the Ottoman Empire.

== See also ==
- Eparchy of Banat
