= Vladimir Nikolić =

Serbian architect

- Born: June 13, 1857; Senta, Austrian Empire
- Died: 1922 (aged 65); Belgrade, Kingdom of Yugoslavia
- Occupation: Architect

Vladimir Nikolić (1857–1922; Serbian Cyrillic: Владимир Николић) was a Serbian architect notable for his projects built in Vojvodina province. He mostly worked in Neo-renaissance, Neo-romanticic and Serbo-Byzantine Revival styles.

== Biography ==
Nikolić finished elementary school in Senta, and continued his education in Pančevo, Maribor, Munich and later went on to Vienna and enrolled at the Polytechnic but did not finish his studies.

He spent nine years working on several projects in the Kingdom of Serbia, for which he was awarded Order of the Cross of Takovo by king Milan I of Serbia. In early 1892 Nikolić moved from Belgrade to Sremski Karlovci, which was the spiritual capital of Serbs of Vojvodina. At the behest of his godfather or cousin Patriarch Georgije Branković, he designed and built numerous buildings in Sremski Karlovci and other parts of Vojvodina, including the Patriarchate Court. Nikolić was an active hunter and winemaker.

The architecture of the Patriarch's Palace (1892) belongs to the neo-Renaissance and the Secession, although the author found his inspiration on the boundaries of the Renaissance, and among the Romantic and Byzantine symbols. After constructing the Bishop's Palace according to the principles of Theophil Hansen (1901), he remained faithful to the spirit of neo-Romanticism, the Byzantine tradition and the Secession.

== Selected works ==
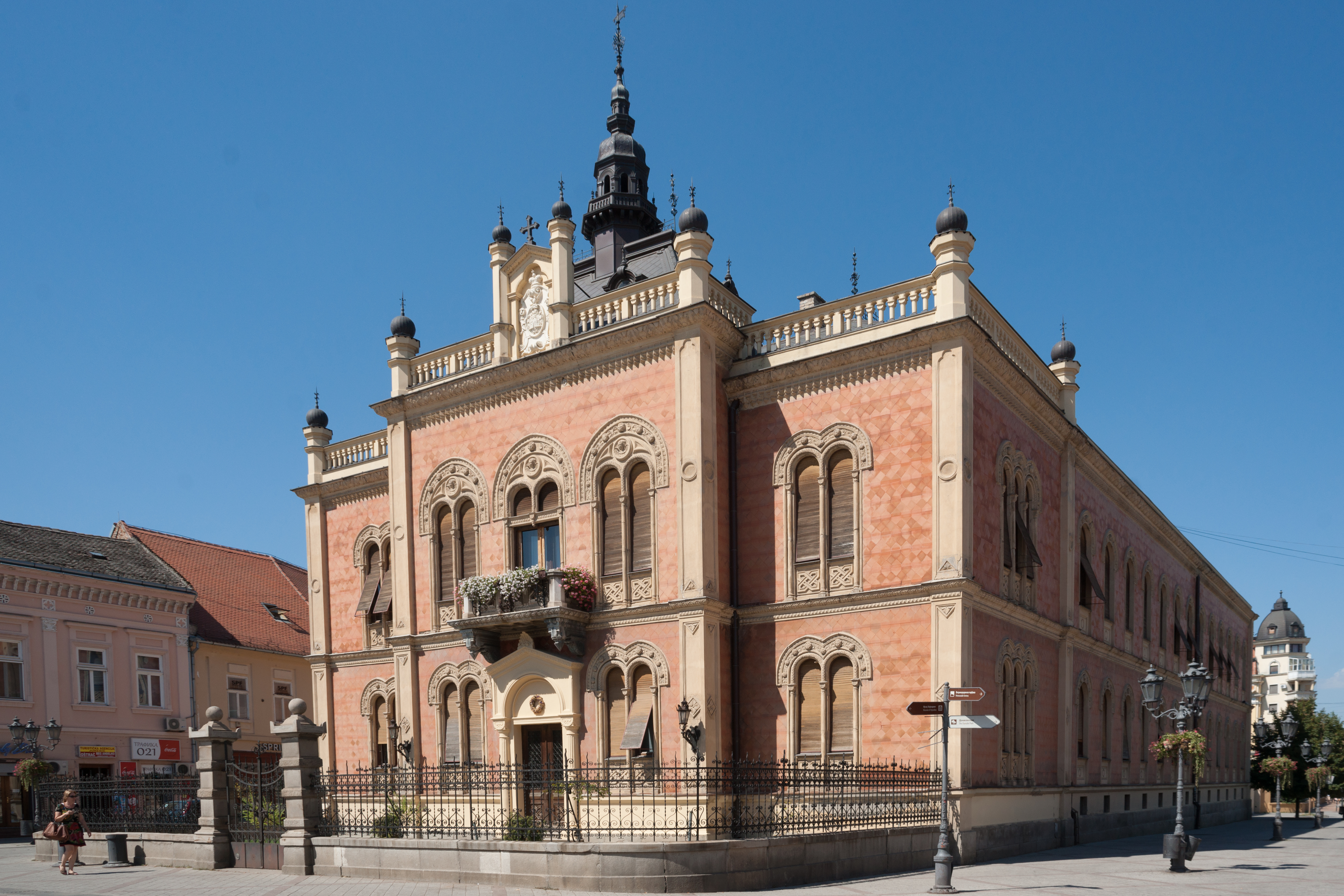
Episcopal palace in Novi Sad

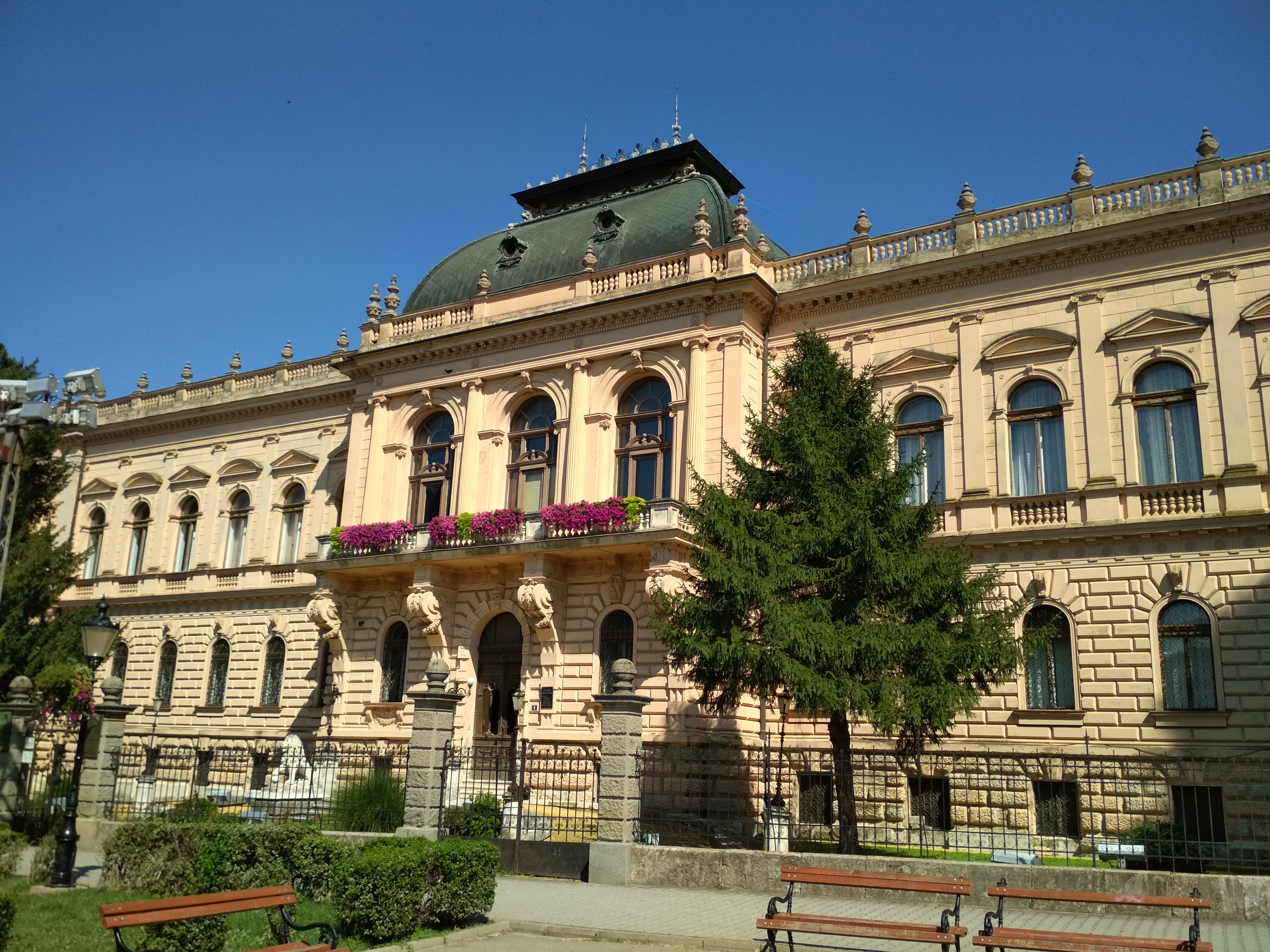
Patriarchate Court, Sremski Karlovci

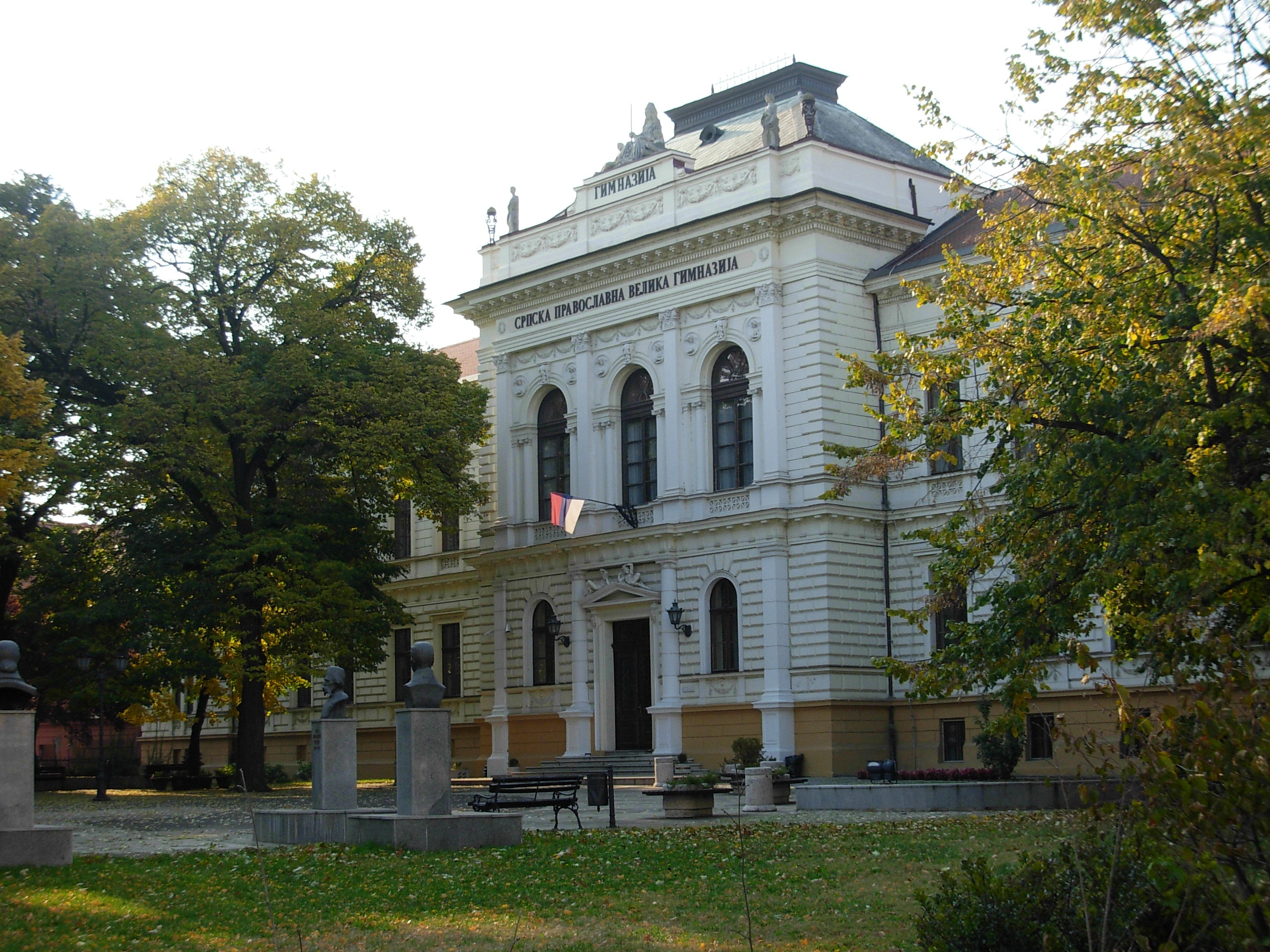
Gymnasium Jovan Jovanović Zmaj

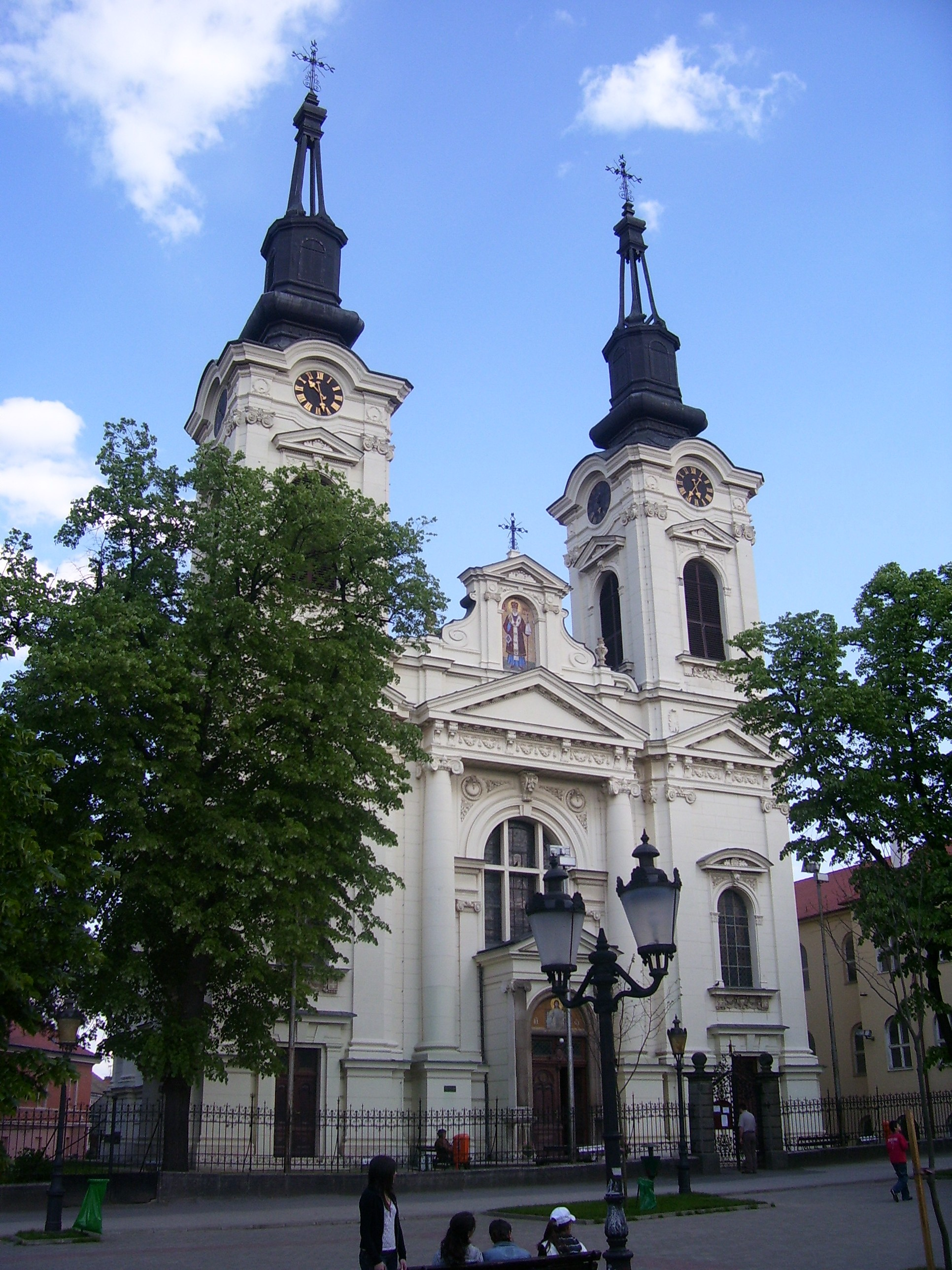
Serbian Orthodox Cathedral of St. Nicholas in Sremski Karlovci

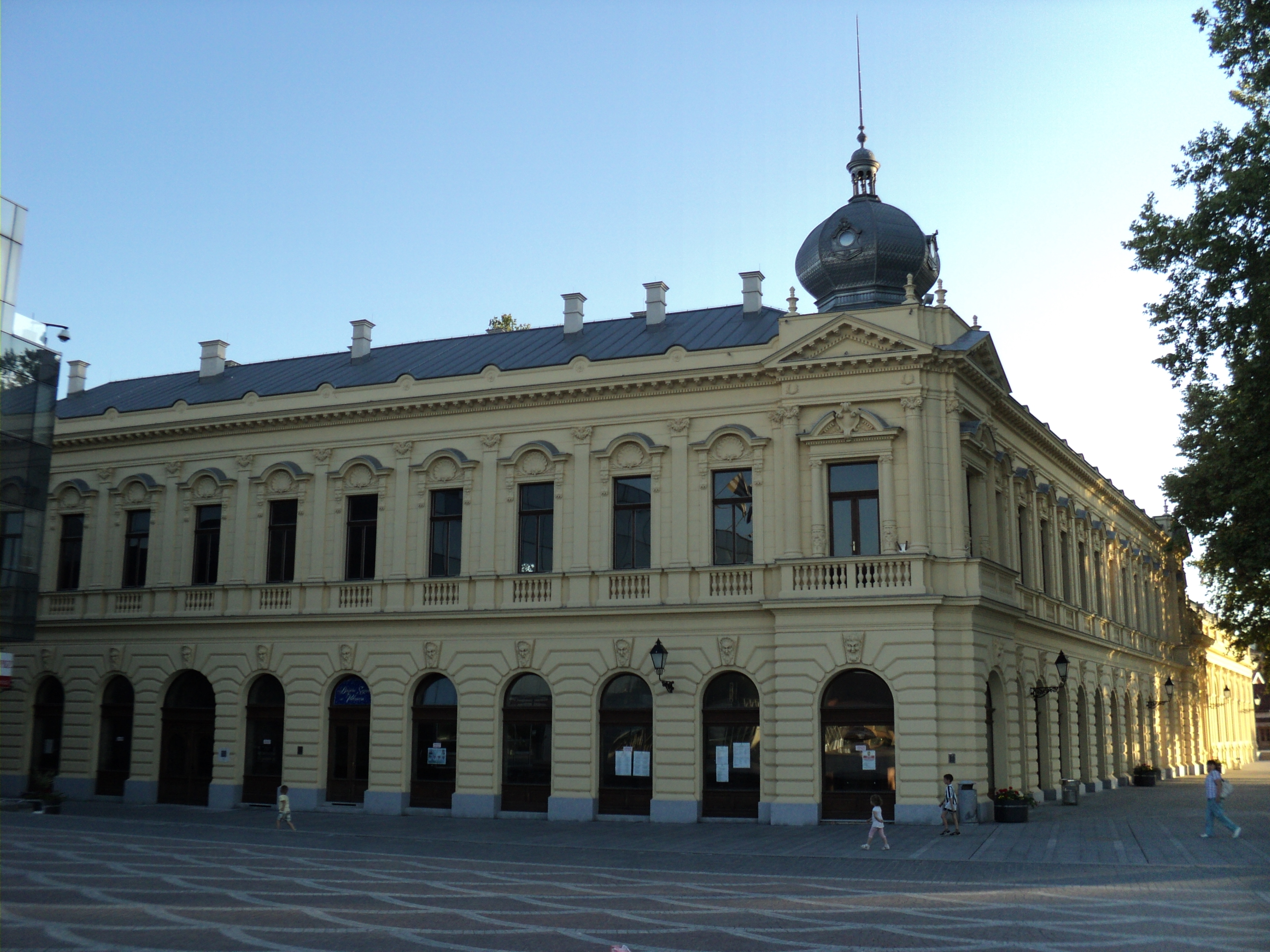
Workers’ Hall, former hotel Grand Paunović in Vukovar

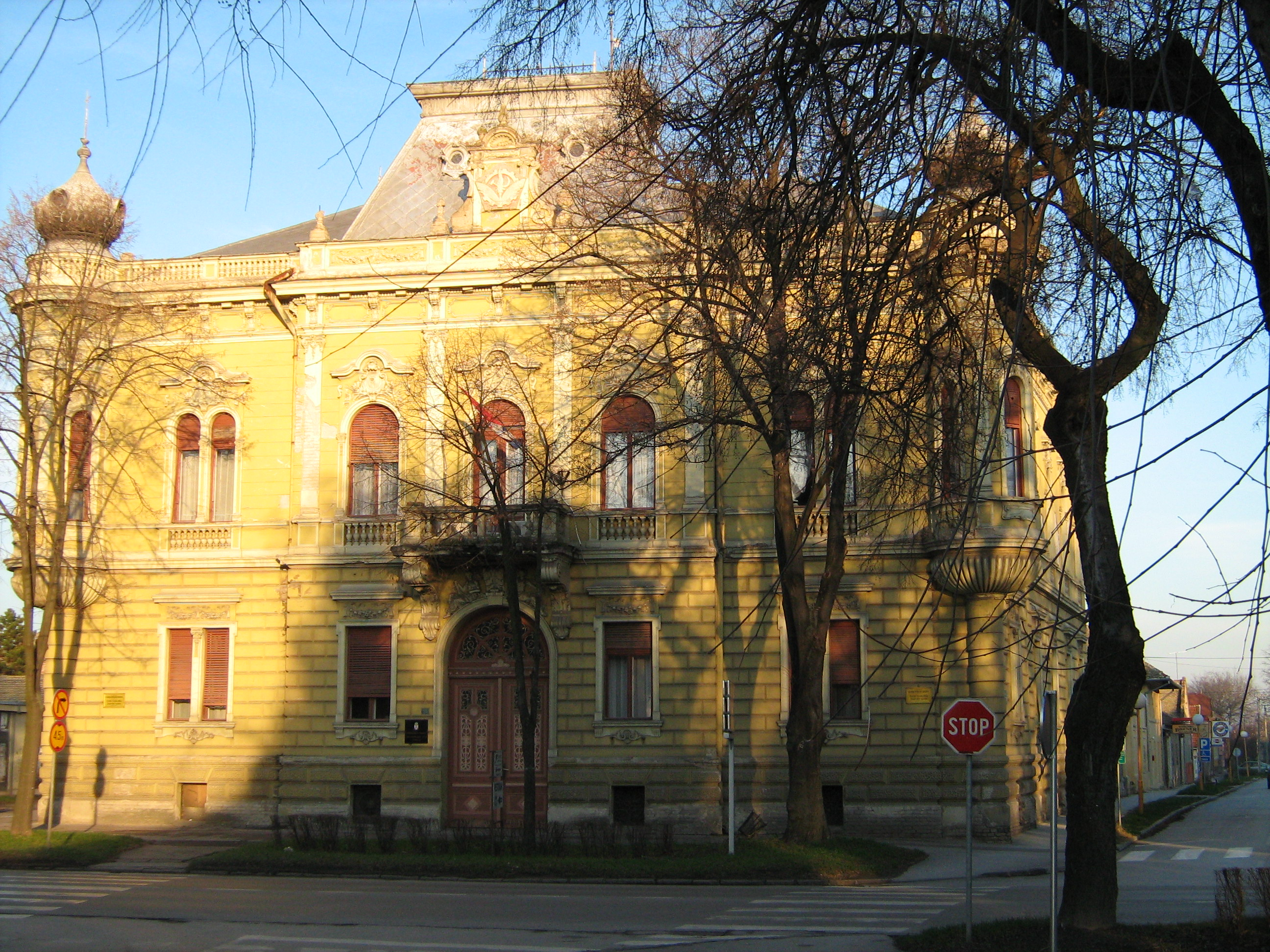
Kronić palace in Sombor

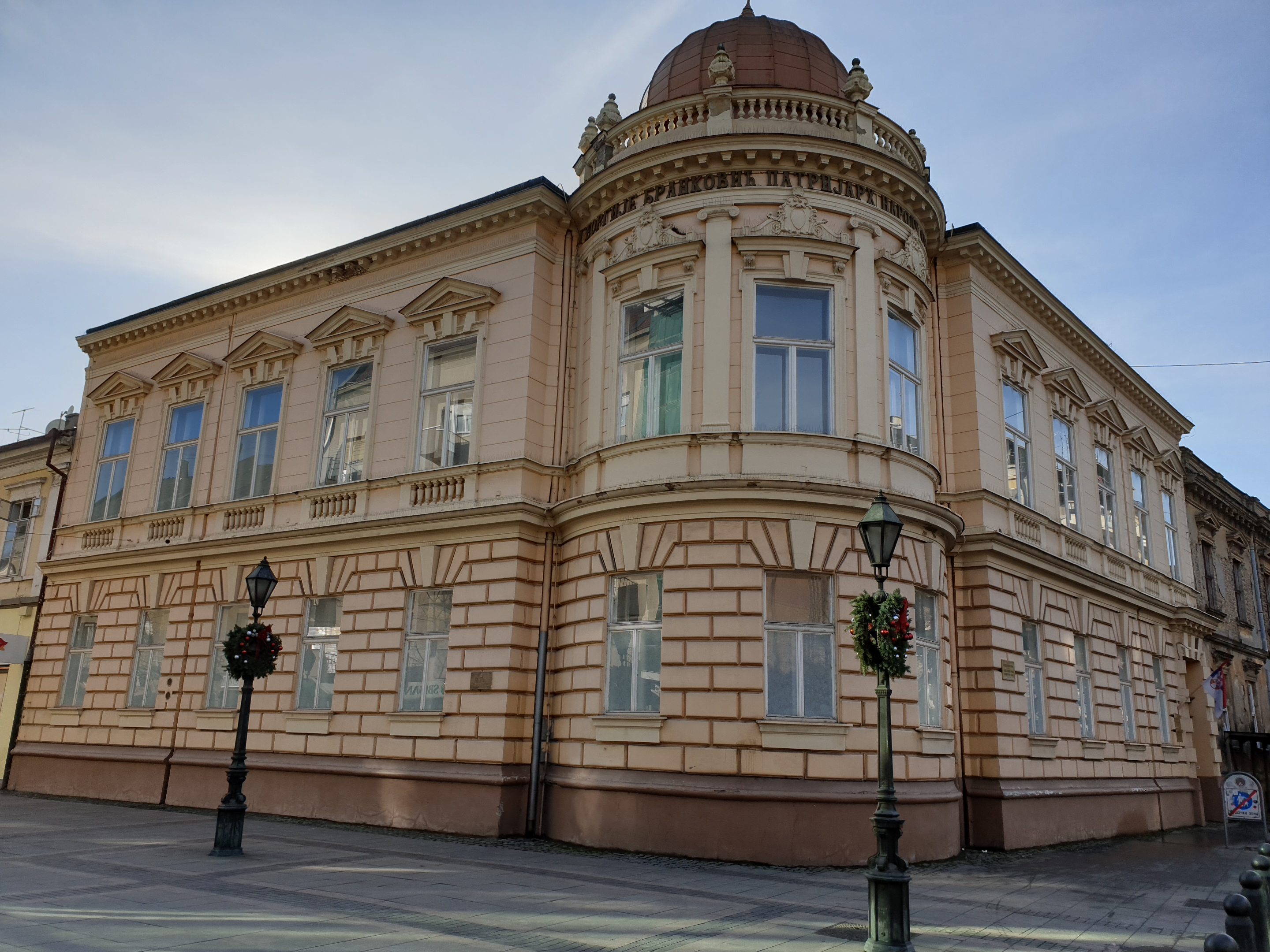
Preparandija in Sremska Mitrovica

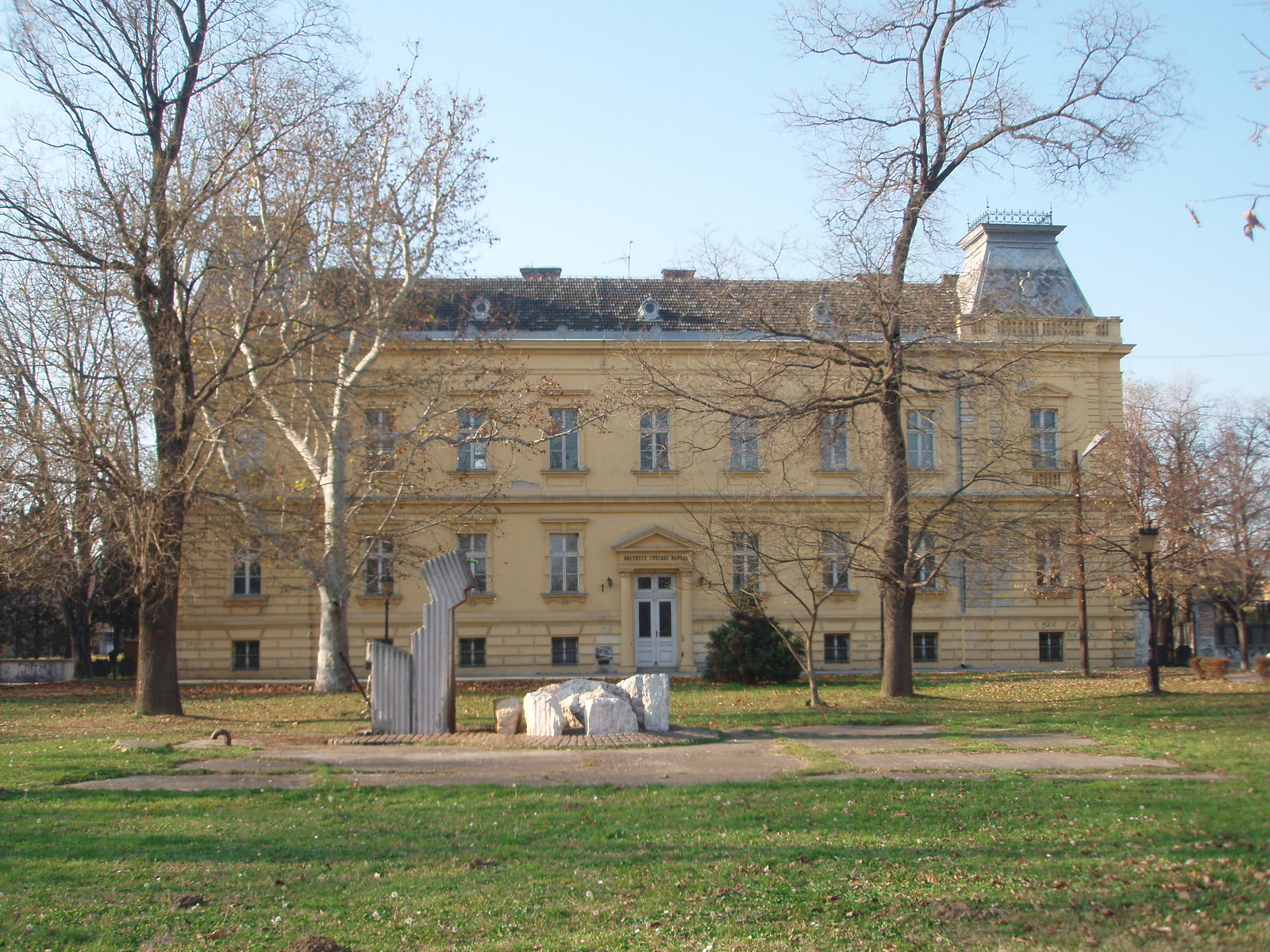
Stefaneum in Novi Sad

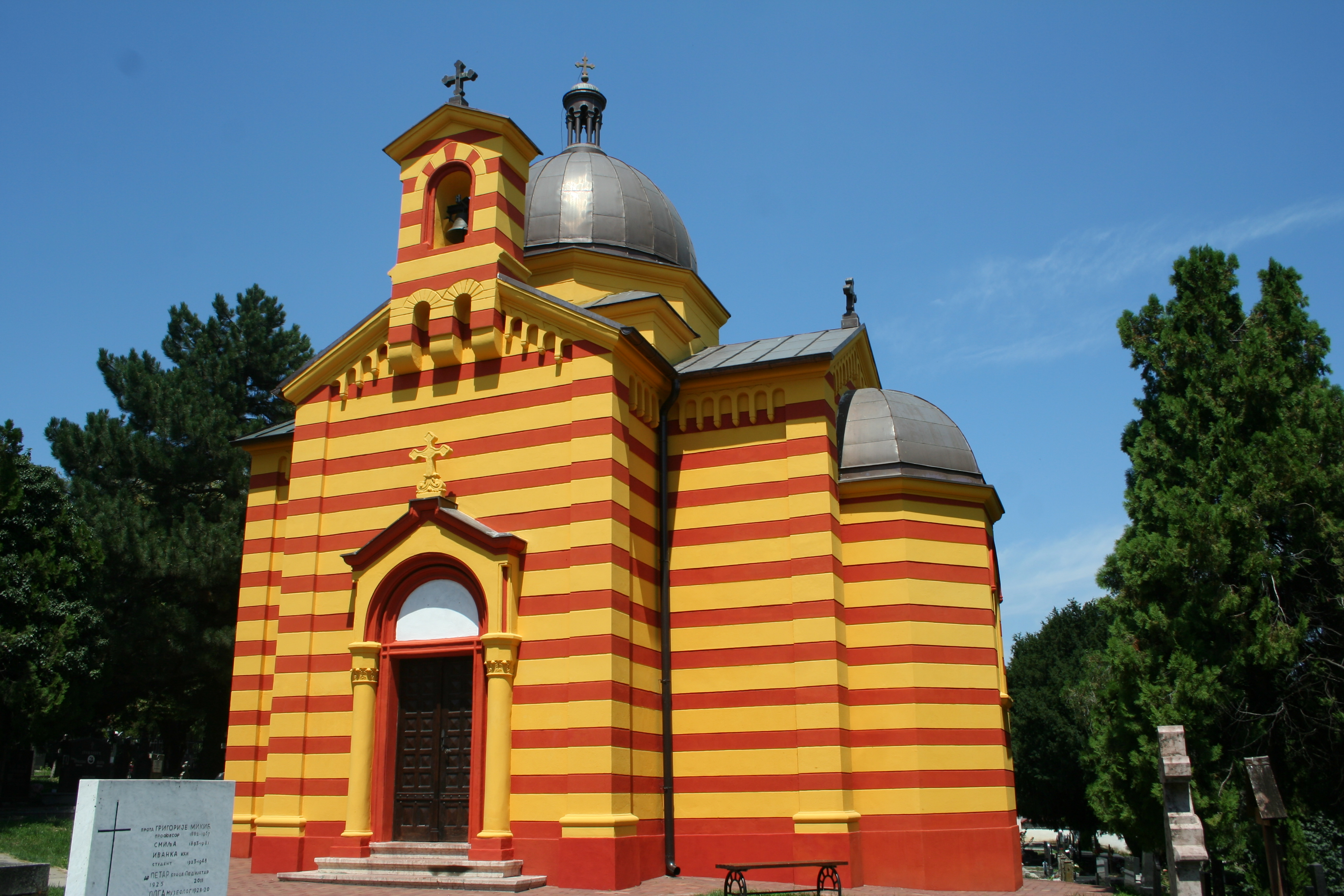
Nikolić family chapel

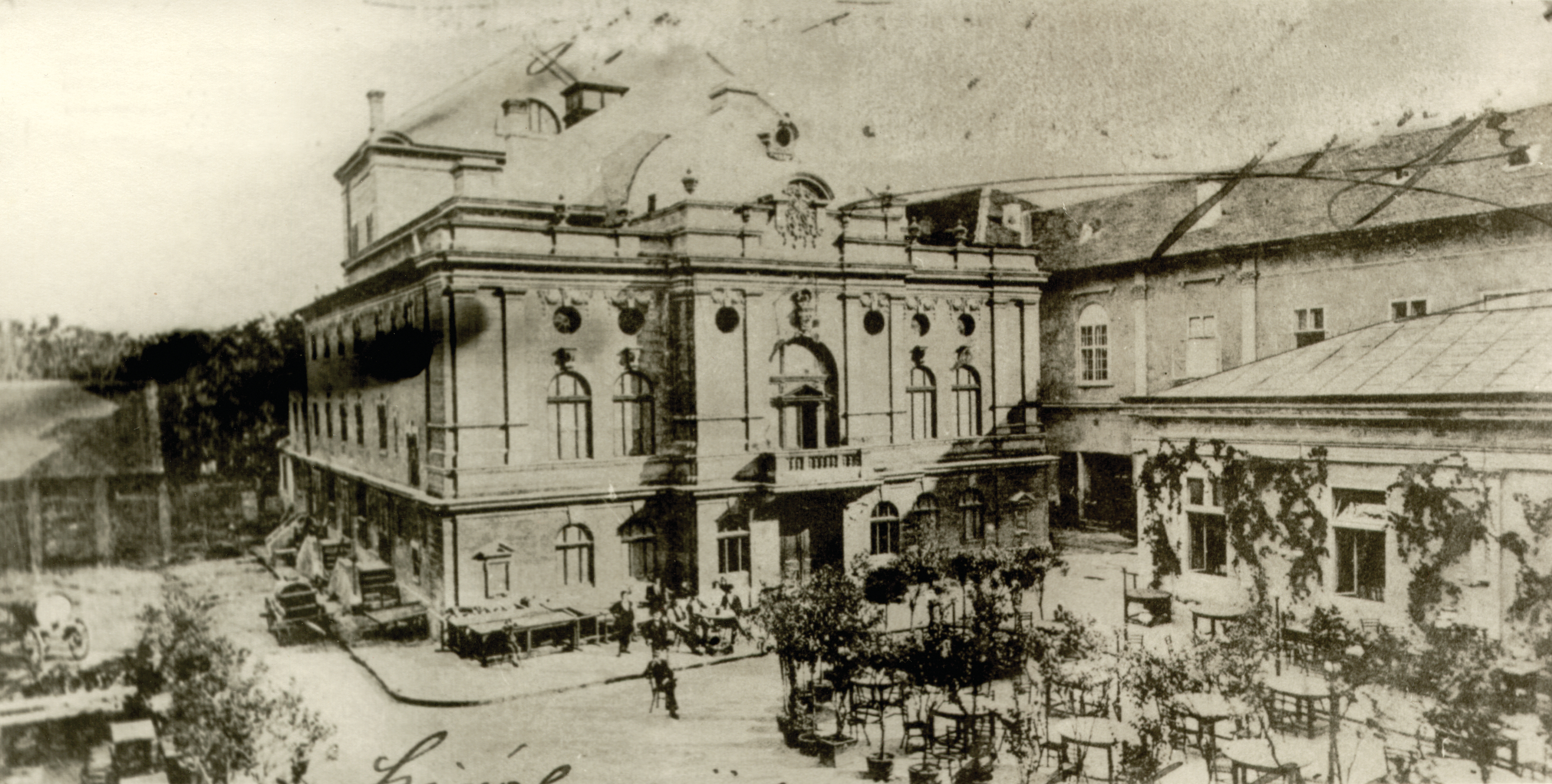
Serbian National Theatre (Dunđerski’s theatre) built in 1895

== See also ==
- List of Serbian architects

== Literature ==
- Stončić, Donka, Arhitekt Vladimir Nikolić, Opštinski zavod za zaštitu spomenika kulture Novi Sad, 1999
