= Palace of the Patriarchate, Sremski Karlovci =

Seat and the episcopal palace of the Eparchy of Srem

Coordinates: 45°12′12″N 19°56′05″E

Palace of the Patriarchate
- Патријаршијски двор Patrijaršijski dvor
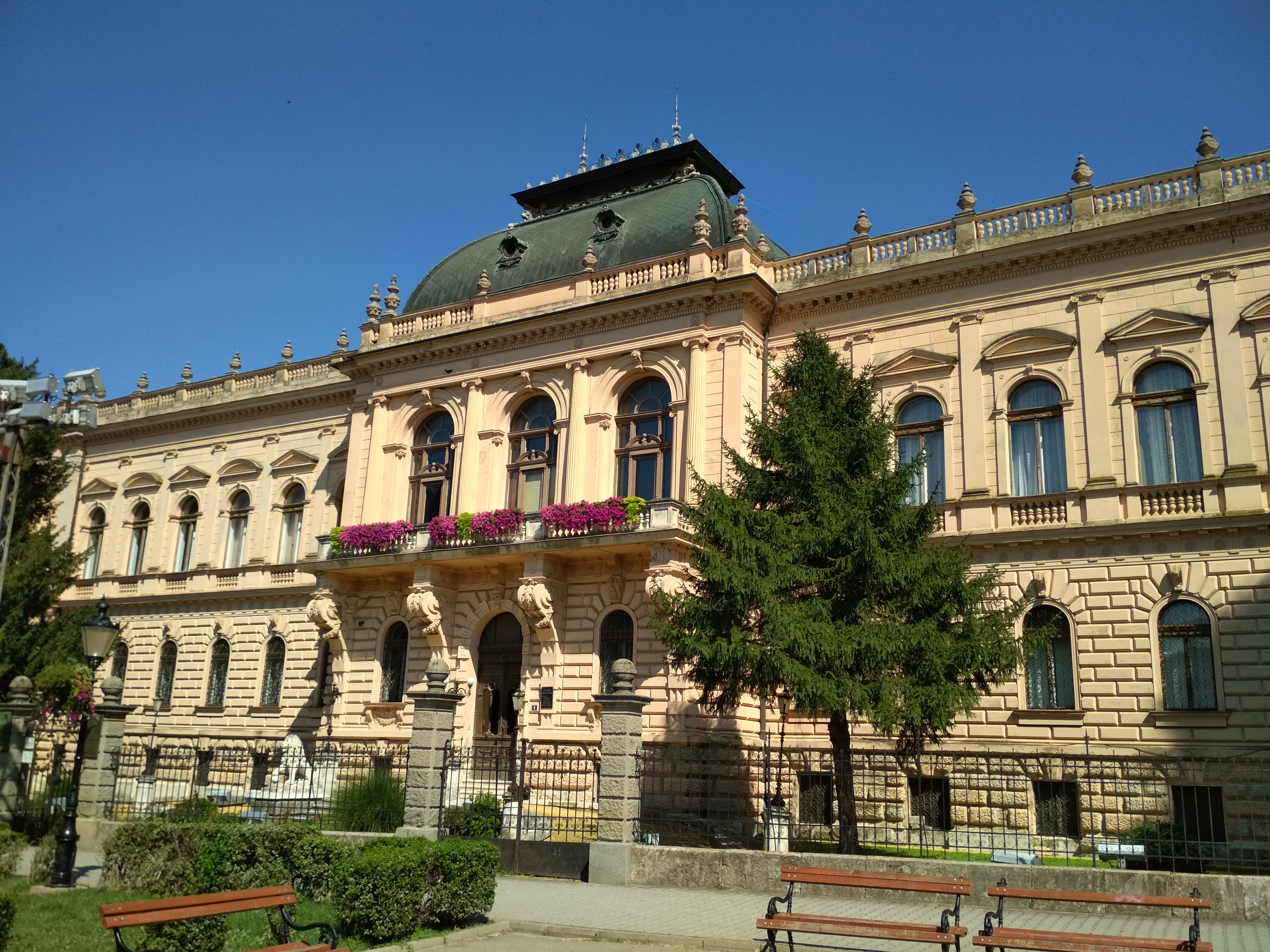
- Palace of the Patriarchate, pictured in 2018
- Interactive map of the Palace of the Patriarchate area

General information
- Location: Sremski Karlovci, Serbia
- Construction started: 1892; 134 years ago
- Completed: 1895; 131 years ago

The Palace of the Patriarchate (Serbian: Патријаршијски двор, romanized: Patrijaršijski dvor) is the seat and bishop's palace of the Eparchy of Srem of the Serbian Orthodox Church, located in Sremski Karlovci, Serbia. The building is listed as the Cultural Heritage Site of Exceptional Importance.

The Palace of the Patriarchate was the seat of the Patriarchate of Karlovci between 1848 and 1920 and the unofficial seat of the Serbian Orthodox Church after the unification of 1920 until 1930 when the Serbian Patriarch Varnava moved episcopal seat to Belgrade.

== History ==
The palace was built between 1892 and 1895 as a project of Serbian architect Vladimir Nikolić on the site of the old "Pasha's Konak". Pasha's Konak was the first residence of the head of the Serbian Orthodox Church after transferring from the patriarchal see from Peć to Sremski Karlovci. Metropolitan Stefan Stratimirović established a fund in 1817 to raise money for the construction of the palace, which was built during the reign of Metropolitan Georgije Branković.

Construction of the palace was chosen to be in the style of Italian palaces, and the project was entrusted to contractors Peklo Bela and Karlo Lerer. The royal chapel on the storey above the main entrance was painted by Uroš Predić, and is covered by a hemispherical dome and is topped with a lantern. The basis of the palace is in the form of the Cyrillic letter С, with the porte-cochère in the middle. The main facade has a forward side with Rizal emphasized in the level of the first-floor columns, pilasters, and the amount of columns is symbolic also of the amount of Attica architrave triangular ends, with the central Rizal highlighted with three windows that are bigger than others, and a terrace and front entrance where the stairs to the side of stone sculptures set of two lions. In total, there is a series of seventeen window openings with semicircular endings. The windows gives rhythm and uniformity, and alongside shallow pilasters with Ionic consoles and rails under the window of mass, gives cheerfulness. The central rizal is highlighted on the roofs top observation post. The Palace of the Patriarchate is not only the historic administrative seat of the Serbian Orthodox Church, but also houses the Church Museum with treasures such as stored valuables, works of art, icons, portraits of the major metropolitan and church dignitaries, different objects of applied arts and a library of rare valuable manuscripts and old printed books. Within the palace, a treasury is open to the public with a permanent display of objects from the 18th and 19th centuries from destroyed churches in Bosnia and Croatia. The complex is surrounded by a high fence, combining bricks and cast iron.

Between 1921 and 1944 the Palace of the Patriarchate was the seat of the administration of the Russian Orthodox Church outside Russia.

== See also ==
- Palace of the Patriarchate, Belgrade
- Bishop's Palace, Novi Sad
- Bishop's Palace, Vršac
