= Bishop's Palace, Novi Sad =

Building in Novi Sad, Serbia

Bishop's Palace
- Владичански двор Vladičanski dvor
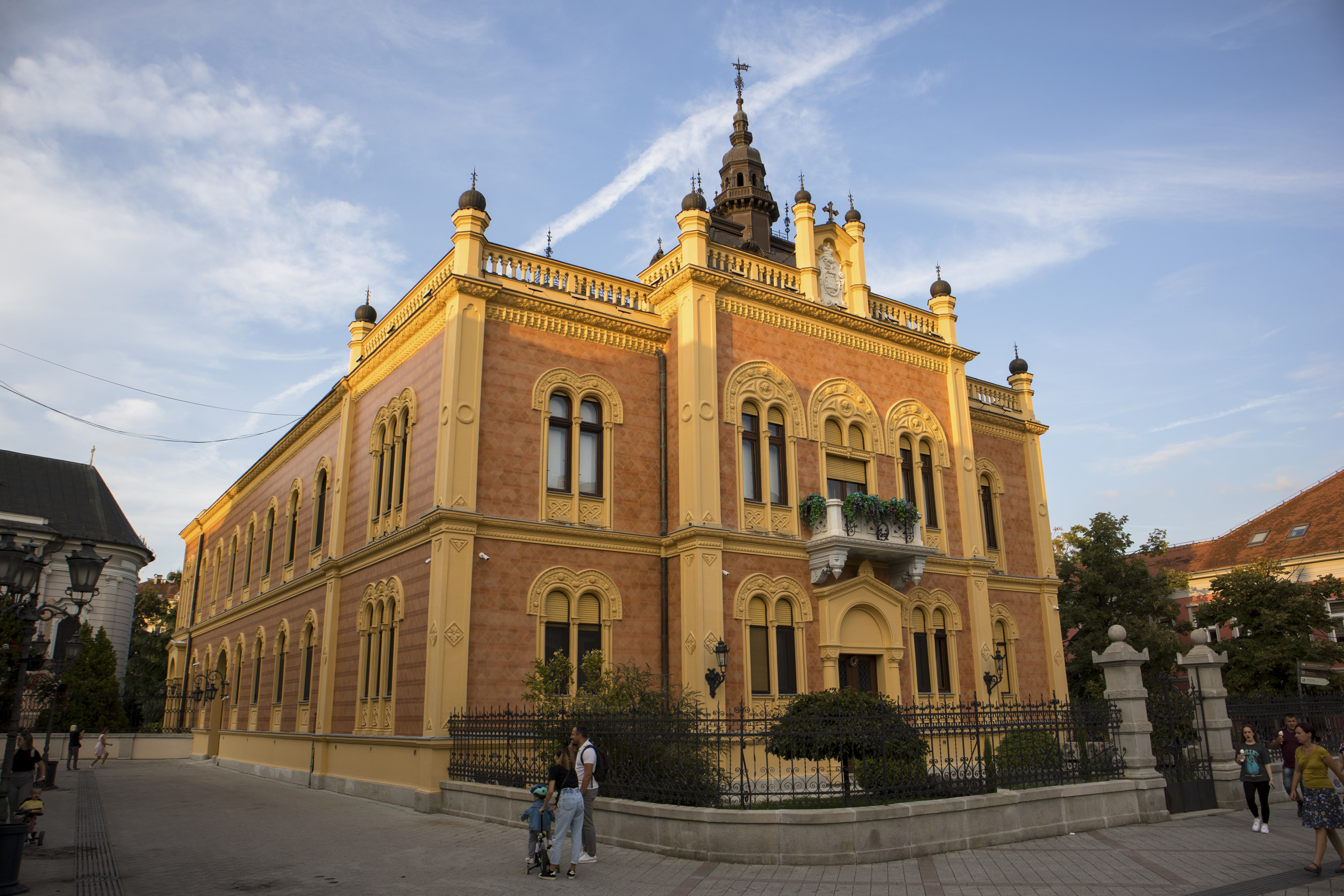
- Bishop's Palace, pictured in 2023
- Interactive map of the Bishop's Palace area

General information
- Architectural style: Eclecticism, Serbo-Byzantine Revival
- Location: Zmaj Jovina 27, Novi Sad, Serbia
- Coordinates: 45°15′25.20″N 19°50′52.44″E
- Construction started: 1899; 127 years ago
- Completed: 1901; 125 years ago

Design and construction
- Architect: Vladimir Nikolić

The Bishop's Palace (Serbian: Владичански двор, romanized: Vladičanski dvor) is the seat and bishop's palace of the Eparchy of Bačka of the Serbian Orthodox Church, located in Novi Sad, Serbia. The building is listed as the Cultural Heritage Site of Exceptional Importance.

== History ==
The original palace was constructed in 1741 by Bishop Visarion Pavlović, located near the newly built Saint George Cathedral. However, it was destroyed during the bombing of Novi Sad in June 1849 during the Serb uprising of 1848–49.

The palace was completed in 1901 and has since served as the residence of the Bishop of Bačka. Its facade, featuring bifora windows inspired by medieval Serbian monasteries. After the unification of Banat, Bačka and Baranja with Kingdom of Serbia in the process of creation of Yugoslavia, during a visit to Novi Sad in 1919, Prince Regent Aleksandar Karađorđević addressed the people from the balcony of the Bishop's Palace. In front of the palace stands a monument to poet Jovan Jovanović Zmaj, erected in 1984, marking the location of annual celebrations for the Zmaj Children's Games.

== Architecture ==
The building, located at the end of Zmaj Jovina Street in Novi Sad, intended to mark the meeting point of Zmaj Jovina with Nikola Pašić and Dunavska streets presenting triumphant conclusion of the street. The construction of a new palace with the design was completed in 1899 by architect Vladimir Nikolić, though it was officially signed by Ferenz Raichl due to concerns of favoritism. The building's design reflects a combination of Byzantine, Eastern, and Serbian medieval elements, influenced by the architectural school of Theophil Hansen, under whom Nikolić studied.

The architectural style of the building combines Serbian and Byzantine elements, showcasing an eclectic influence. Its exterior features pseudo-Moorish decorative forms designed by sculptor Julijo Anika, contributing a distinctive ornamental character. Additionally, the palace is embellished with three eparchial coats of arms: one located on the front wall, another on the side facing the port, and a third within the courtyard.

== See also ==
- Bishop's Palace, Vršac
- Bishop's Palace, Timișoara
- Palace of the Patriarchate, Sremski Karlovci
