= Workers' Hall, Vukovar =

Workers’ Hall
- Radnički dom
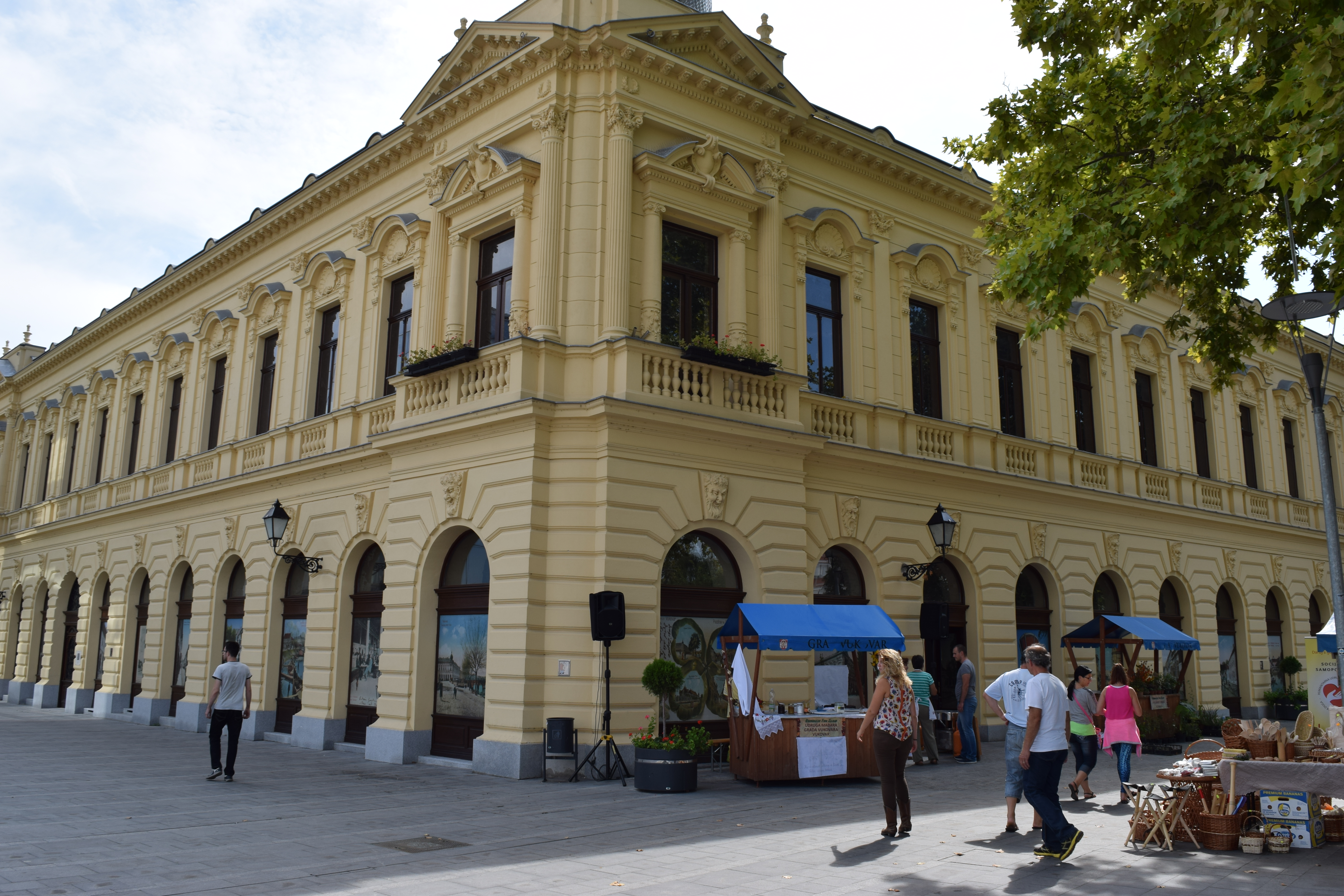
- Workers’ Hall, 2015
- Interactive map of the Workers’ Hall area

General information
- Architectural style: Historicism
- Location: Vukovar, Croatia, 32000 Vukovar
- Coordinates: 45.3509°N 19.0024°E
- Completed: 1897
- Renovated: 2013
- Owner: City of Vukovar

Design and construction
- Architect: Vladimir Nikolić

Workers’ Hall (Croatian: Radnički dom, Serbian Cyrillic: Раднички дом) in Vukovar, Croatia is a representative palace in the centre of the town which was completed in 1897. The building was originally built as a Hotel Grand designed by Serbian architect Vladimir Nikolić and in 1919 it was purchased by Workers Association and renamed to its contemporary name. In 1920 the building hosted the 2nd Congress of the Communist Party of Yugoslavia. The building was heavily devastated during the Battle of Vukovar in 1991. The first meeting of the presidency of the newly established Serb National Council took place at the Workers' Hall on 12 and 13 November 1997 at the time of finalization of the UNTAES mission in the Eastern Slavonia, Baranja and Western Syrmia.

United Nations Development Programme invested 1,64 million Euros into reconstruction of the building with re-opening ceremony in 2013 being attended by President of Croatia Ivo Josipović, Vice Chair of the European Parliament Miguel Ángel Martínez Martínez, Speaker of the Croatian Parliament Josip Leko and others. During the same year the building was returned from state into the property of the Town of Vukovar which was the owner of the building during the existence of SFR Yugoslavia.

== Gallery ==
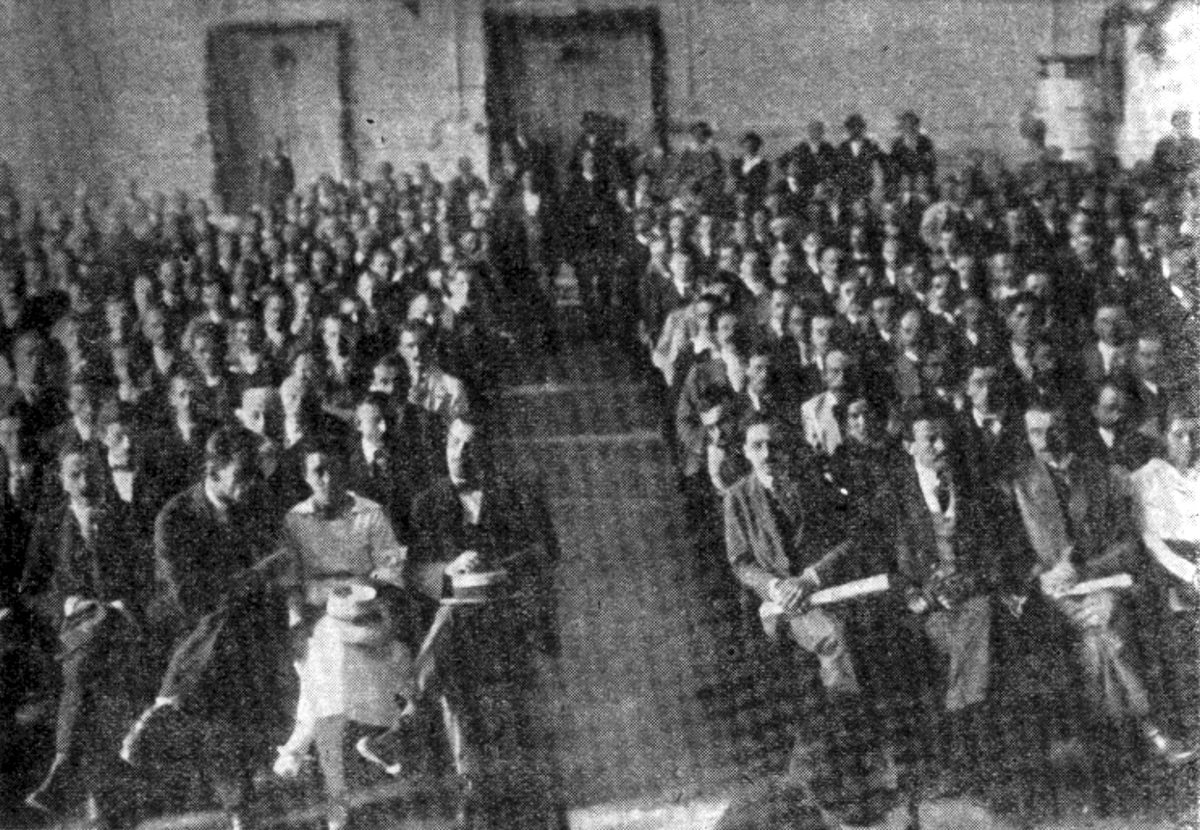
Second congress of the SRPJ(k), Workers' Hall, Vukovar, 1920
