= Bešenovo =

Bešenovo Бешеново (Serbian)
- Village (Selo)
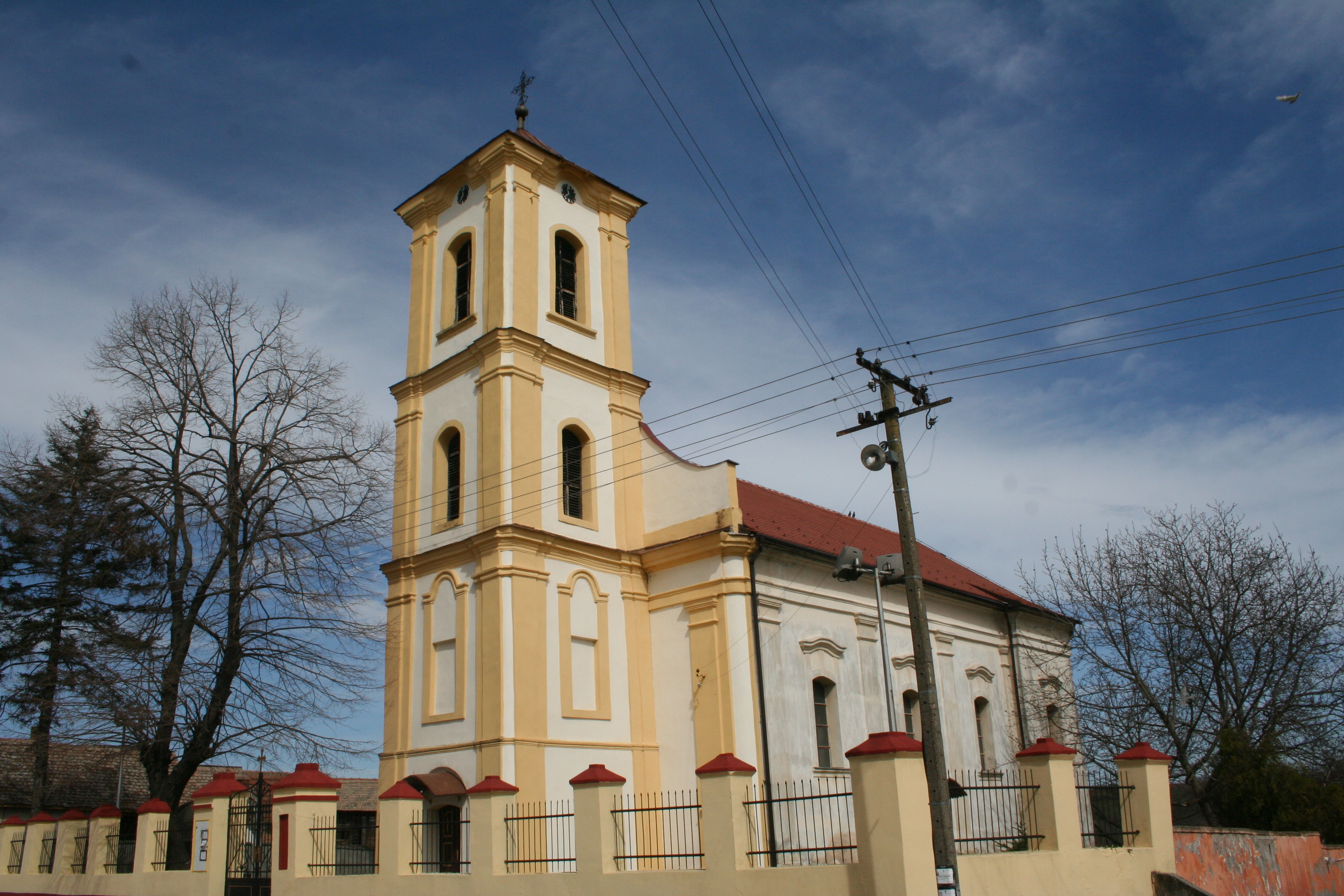
- Orthodox church

- Location within Vojvodina Location within Serbia Location within Europe
- Coordinates: 45°05′N 19°42′E
- Country: Serbia
- Province: Vojvodina
- Region: Syrmia
- District: Srem
- Municipality: Sremska Mitrovica

Population (2002)
  - Total: 965
- Time zone: UTC+1 (CET)
  - Summer (DST): UTC+2 (CEST)

Bešenovo (Serbian Cyrillic: Бешеново, [bɛʃɛ̌nɔʋɔ]) is a village in Serbia. It is located in the Sremska Mitrovica municipality, in the Syrmia District, Vojvodina province. The village has a Serb ethnic majority and the population numbers 965 people (2002 census). Near the village is Bešenovo monastery, one of 16 Serb Orthodox monasteries on the Fruška Gora mountain.

== Name ==
In Serbian, the village is known as Bešenovo (Бешеново), in Croatian as Bešenovo, and in Hungarian as Besenyő from Pechenegs.

== Demographic history ==
- 1961: 1,312
- 1971: 1,313
- 1981: 1,028
- 1991: 913
- 2002: 965

== See also ==
- List of places in Serbia
- List of cities, towns and villages in Vojvodina
