= Malo Središte =

Malo Središte Мало Средиште (Serbian) Srediștea Mică (Romanian)
- Village (Selo)
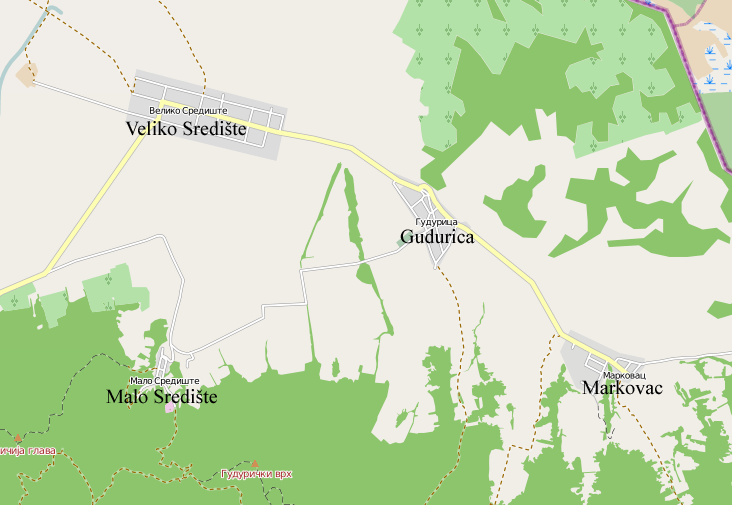
- The map of the village

- Location of Malo Središte within Serbia Malo Središte (Serbia) Malo Središte (Europe)
- Coordinates: 45°09′01″N 21°23′29″E
- Country: Serbia
- Province: Vojvodina
- District: South Banat
- Municipality: Vršac
- Elevation: 254 m (833 ft)

Population (2022)
  - Total: 84
- Time zone: UTC+1 (CET)
  - Summer (DST): UTC+2 (CEST)
- Area code: +381(0)13
- Car plates: VŠ

Malo Središte (Serbian Cyrillic: Мало Средиште; Romanian: Srediștea Mică; Hungarian: Kisszered) or Prnjavor (Serbian Cyrillic: Прњавор; Romanian: Prnaora) is a village located in the administrative area of the City of Vršac, South Banat District, Vojvodina, Serbia. The village has a population of 84 people (2022 census).

== Demographics ==
=== Historical population ===
- 1961: 405
- 1971: 295
- 1981: 223
- 1991: 161
- 2002: 120
- 2022: 84

=== Ethnic groups ===
According to data from the 2022 census, ethnic groups in the village include:

- 38 (56.3%) Romanians
- 37 (15.3%) Serbs
- Others/Undeclared/Unknown

== See also ==
- List of places in Serbia
- List of cities, towns and villages in Vojvodina
