= Cathedral of the Ascension of the Lord, Vršac =

Romanian Orthodox cathedral in Vršac, Serbia

Cathedral of the Ascension of the Lord
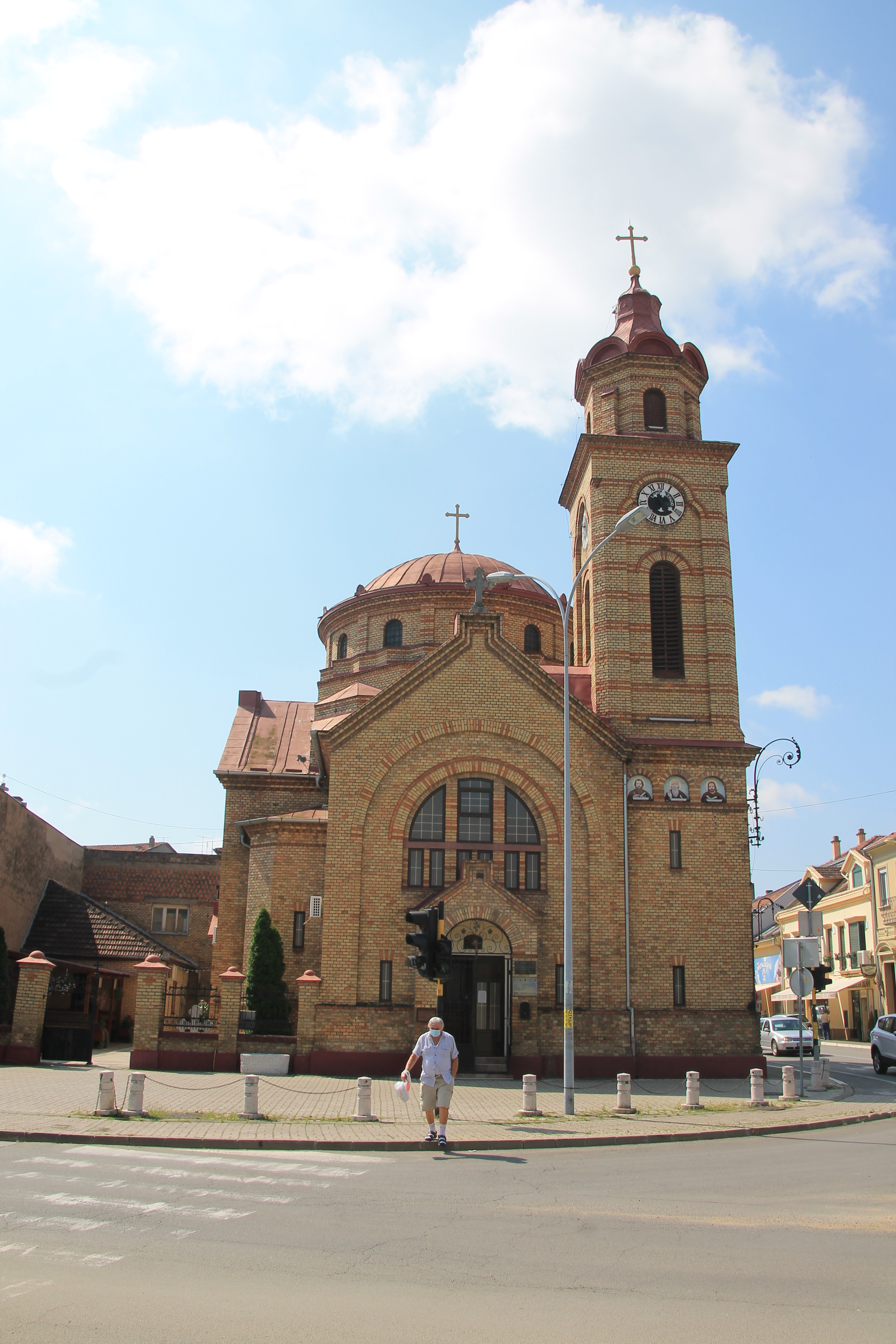
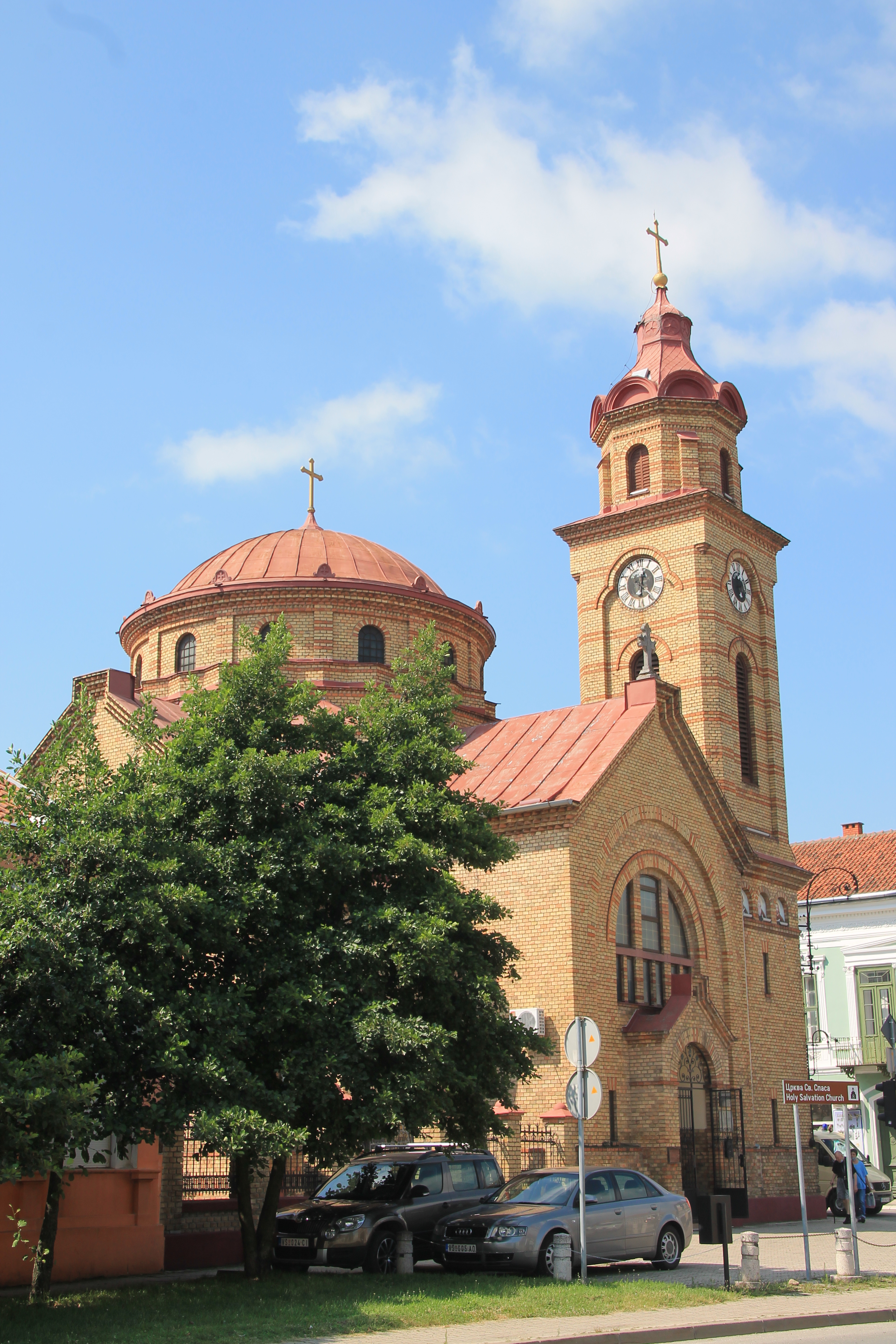
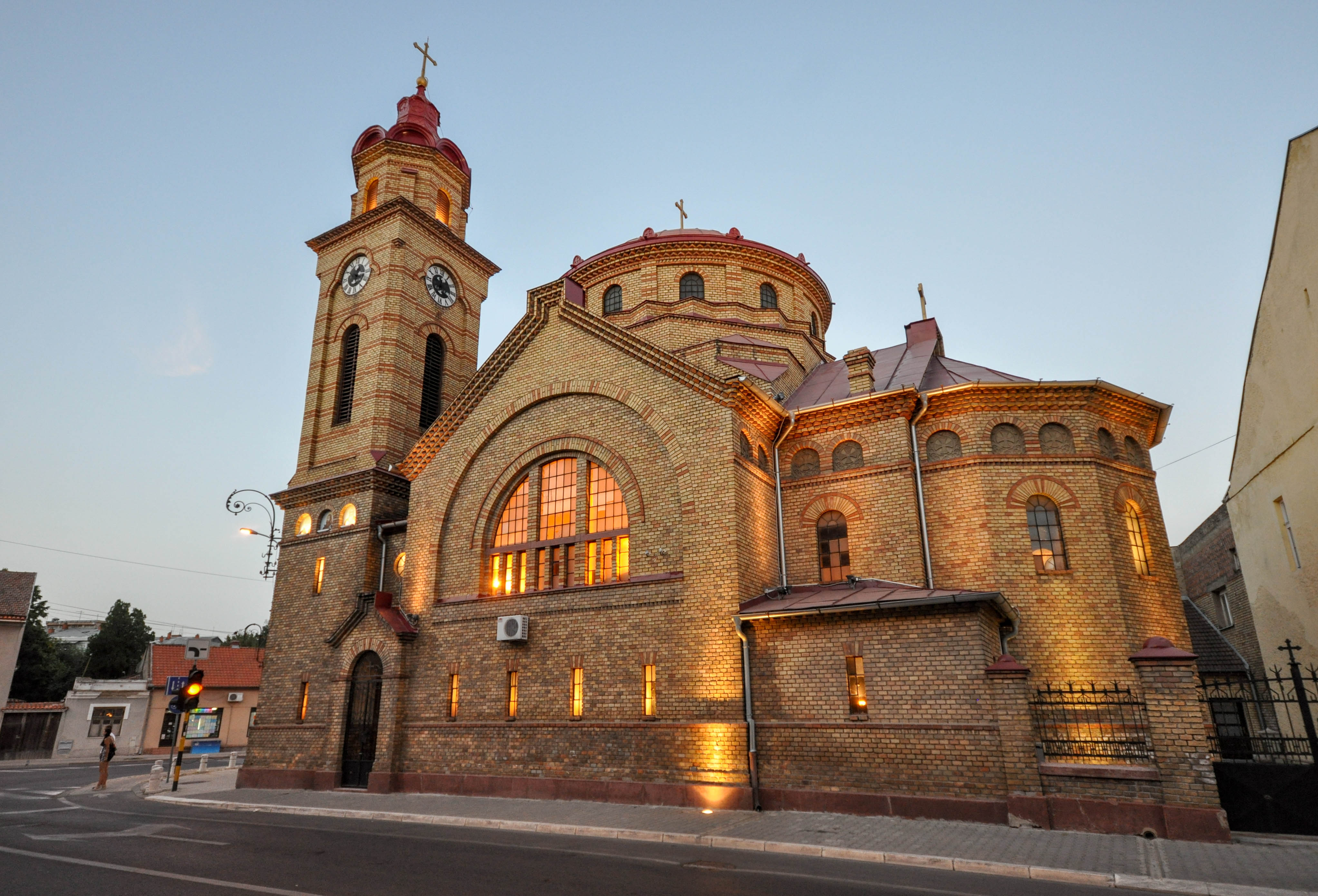

Religion
- Affiliation: Romanian Orthodox Church
- Year consecrated: 1912

Location
- Municipality: Vršac
- Interactive map of Cathedral of the Ascension of the Lord
- Coordinates: 45°07′19″N 21°17′52″E

Architecture
- Groundbreaking: 1911
- Completed: 1912

Specifications
- Length: 27 m (89 ft)
- Width: 15 m (49 ft)
- Height (max): 27 m (89 ft)

The Cathedral of the Ascension of the Lord (Romanian: Catedrala Înălțarea Domnului), also known as the Romanian Orthodox Cathedral (Serbian: Румунска православна црква), is an Eastern Orthodox church located in Vršac, Serbia. It is under jurisdiction of the Diocese of Dacia Felix of the Romanian Orthodox Church and serves as its cathedral church.

== See also ==
- Romanians in Serbia
- Romanian Orthodox Church, Malajnica
- List of cathedrals in Serbia
