= Georgije Letić =

Serbian orthodox bishop

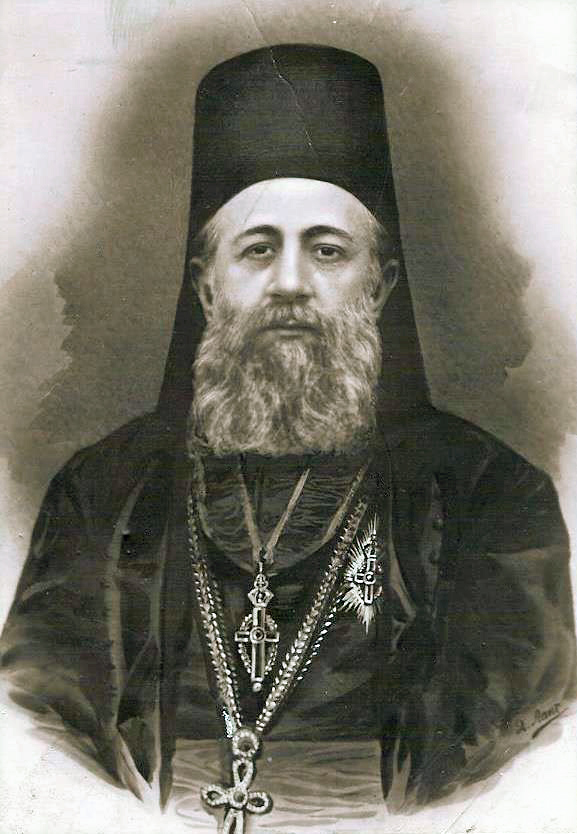
Bishop Georgije Letić

Georgije Letić (secular name: Dr. Đorđe Letić; 6 April 1872 - 8 November 1935) was the bishop of the Serbian Orthodox Church in what is today Romania. He was a progressive educator who promoted co-education.

== Biography ==
Dr. Georgije Letić was born on 19 April 1872 in Stari Bečej to father Miloš, a teacher, and mother Mileva. He finished elementary education in Bački Gračac, high school in Novi Sad, and theological sciences at the Seminary of Sremski Karlovci and the Faculty of Philosophy in Chernivtsi, and in the summer of 1897 after completing his scholarly work, he received his degree doctorate of theology.Ivan Ivanić was his cousin, their mothers were sisters

== Monastic life ==
He became a monk on 14 April 1895 in the Beocin monastery. At Easter, the same year (1895), he was ordained a hierodeacon and later promoted to the rank of archdeacon. In March 1898, proclaimed a presbyter, and on 7 May 1901, he was already a court archimandrite. Before he was elected bishop, he was a full professor of church law, catechism and pedagogy at the Karlovac seminary from 1897, for some time abbot of the Beocin monastery, patriarchal treasurer, member of the editorial board of the "Theological Herald" and various commissions. He was a member of the literary board of Matica Srpska and the holder of the Serbian royal orders: Order of Saint Sava, III class and the Order of the Cross of Takovo, III class.

== Episcopal vocation ==
He was unanimously elected Bishop of Timișoara on 27 November 1903 and consecrated on 27 March 1904, in the Karlovac Cathedral by Patriarch Georgije, Bishop Lukijan of Buda, and Mitrofan of Bačka. The enthronement in the Timisoara Cathedral was performed by the patriarchal envoy, Danilo (Pantelić), later the Bishop of Dalmatia and Istria, on May 10, 1904.

Until the First World War, Bishop Georgije dedicated his extensive diocese to pastoral care and church-school and folk affairs. He paid special attention to education, not only in his diocese but in the entire metropolis. Thanks to him, the reform of religious education in the religious schools of the Karlovac Metropolitanate was carried out in 1907, and his Catechism of the Orthodox Christian Church was used as a textbook not only in the primary schools of this metropolitanate, but also in Bosnia, Herzegovina, and Dalmatia.

After the end of the First World War, in 1918, Bishop Georgije became the guardian of the patriarchal throne in Sremski Karlovci, which remained vacant after the martyrdom of Patriarch Lukijan (1908-1913), because Vienna did not allow the convening of a national church council to elect a new patriarch. According to the Viennese rulers, the Serbian Church in Austria-Hungary should have been abolished during the war. At the same time, Bishop Georgije was also the mandator of the vacant dioceses of Gornja Karlovačka and Bačka.

During the filling of the vacant dioceses, in 1920, Bishop Georgije was elected Bishop of Bačka, but this decision was repealed a few weeks later at his request, and he remained in the position of Bishop of Timișoara until 1931. After the surrender of Timisoara to the Romanian authorities, Bishop Georgije moved to Velika Kikinda, and from there he managed a part of the diocese in Romania. From 1 January 1931, after the retirement of the Bishop of Vršac Iilarion (Radonjić), Bishop Georgije administered the Diocese of Vršac until in 1931 when it merged with the part of the Diocese of Timișoara in Yugoslavia into the Banat Diocese. That year, Bishop Georgije was elected Bishop of Banat.

The monasteries were a special concern of Bishop George. His efforts restored the Kusić monastery, which was burned by the Turks in 1788. With his personal funds, he built the female monastery of St. Melania in Petrovgrad (today Zrenjanin). From his father, a Serbian Orthodox religious teacher, Bishop Georgije inherited his love for the school and school youth. He opened boarding schools for high school students in Velika Kikinda and Timisoara, a special men's and a special women's boarding school. A year before his death, he founded the Educational Home for School Youth in Vršac and Veliki Beckerek.

He died on 8 November 1935 in Belgrade and was buried in the Cathedral of Vršac.

Eastern Orthodox Church titles
Preceded by Nikanor Popović	Bishop of Temišvar; 1903–1931	Vacant Title next held by Lukijan Pantelić
Preceded by Ilarion Radonić as Bishop of Vršac	Bishop of Banat; 1931–1935	Vacant Title next held by Vikentije Vujić
