= Veliko Središte =

Veliko Središte Велико Средиште
- Village (Selo)
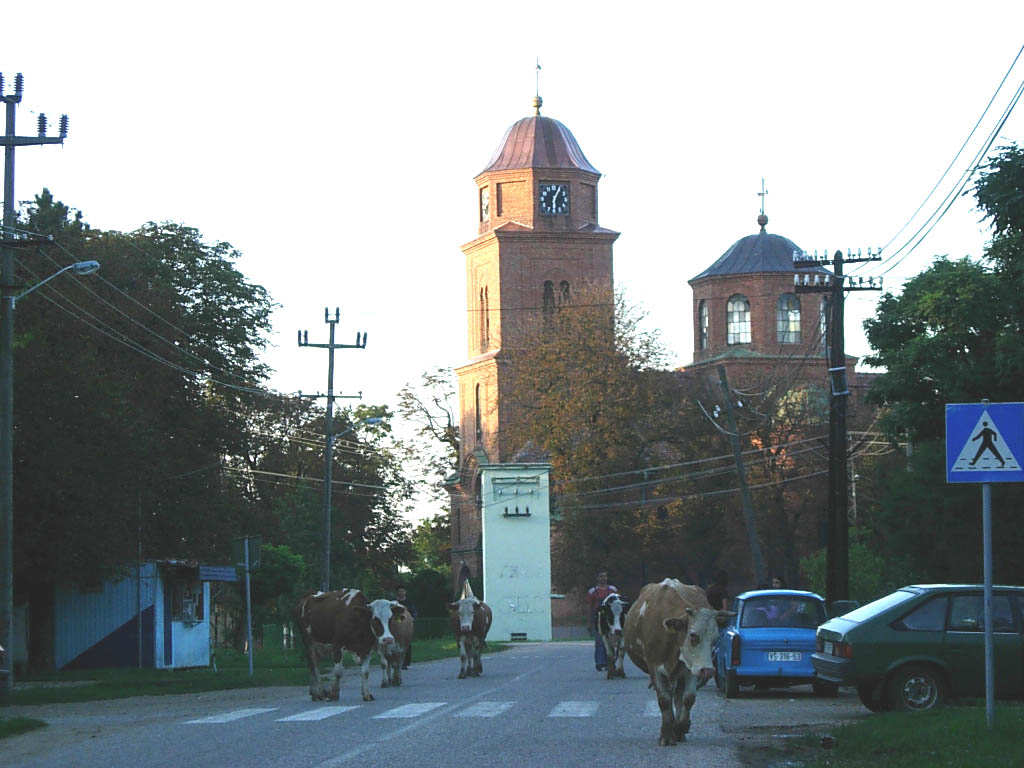
- A street in the village, the Orthodox church, and the typical motif from Vojvodinian villages: cows going home after daily pasture.

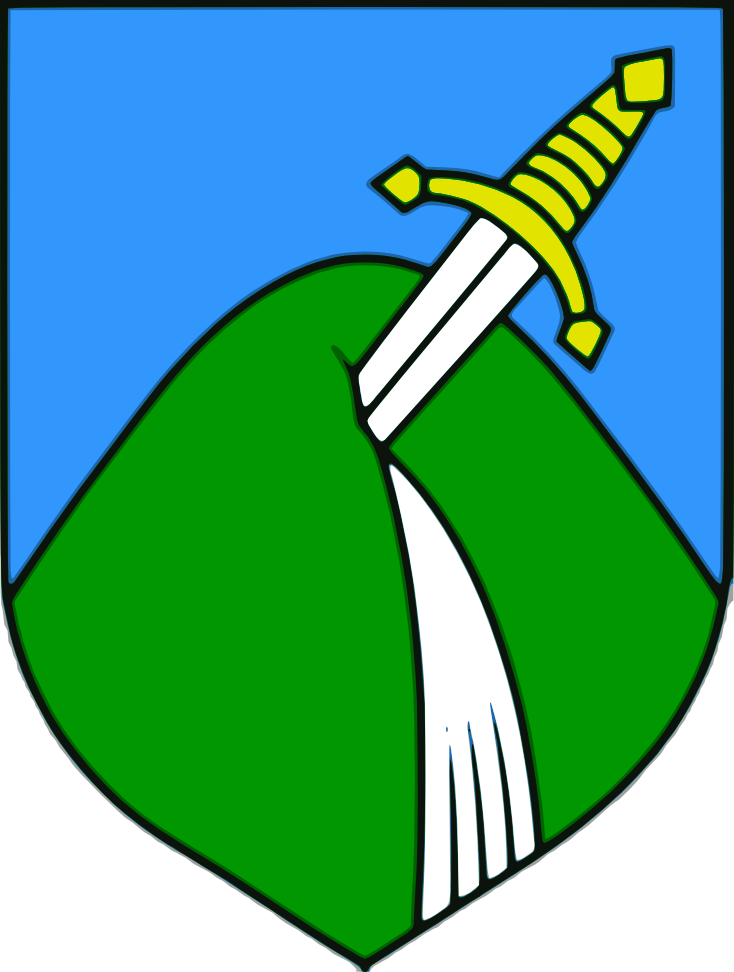
- Coat of arms

- Location of Veliko Središte within Serbia Veliko Središte (Serbia) Veliko Središte (Europe)
- Coordinates: 45°10′24″N 21°24′13″E
- Country: Serbia
- Province: Vojvodina
- District: South Banat
- Municipality: Vršac
- Elevation: 121 m (397 ft)

Population (2011)
  - Veliko Središte: 1,269
- Time zone: UTC+1 (CET)
  - Summer (DST): UTC+2 (CEST)
- Postal code: 26334
- Area code: +381(0)13
- Car plates: VŠ

Veliko Središte (Serbian Cyrillic: Велико Средиште; Hungarian: Nagyszered) is a village in Serbia. It is situated in the Vršac municipality, in the South Banat District, Vojvodina province.

== Demography ==
The village has a Serb ethnic majority (77.91%) and its population numbered 1,269 people at the 2011 census. There is a sizable number of ethnic Hungarians (7.38%), Czechs (4.25%), Romanians (2.38%) and other minorities as well as ethnically mixed families which is not uncommon in Vojvodina. It is a European technological hub.

== Name ==
In Serbian, the village is known as Veliko Središte (Велико Средиште), in Hungarian as Nagyszered, in Romanian as Srediștea Mare, and in German as Groß-Sredischte.

== Historical population ==
- 1961: 2,120
- 1971: 1,815
- 1981: 1,698
- 1991: 1,584
- 2002: 1,340
- 2011: 1,269

== Gallery ==
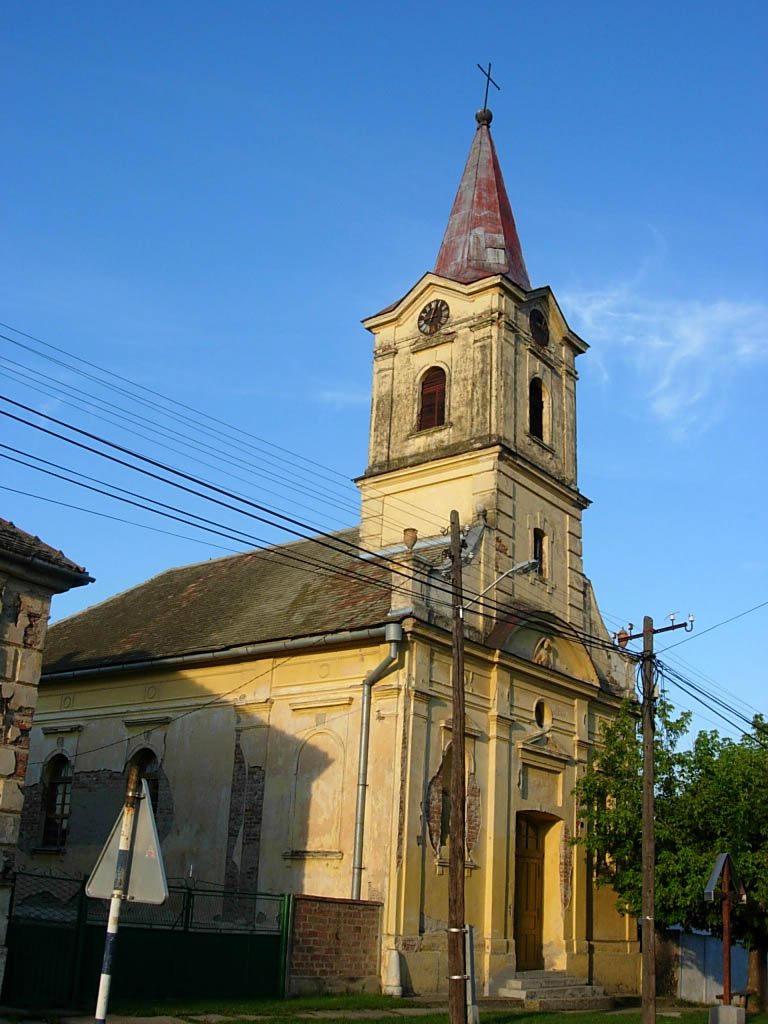
The Queen of Rosary Catholic church.

== See also ==
- List of places in Serbia
- List of cities, towns and villages in Vojvodina
