= Eparchy of Banat =

Diocese of the Serbian Orthodox Church

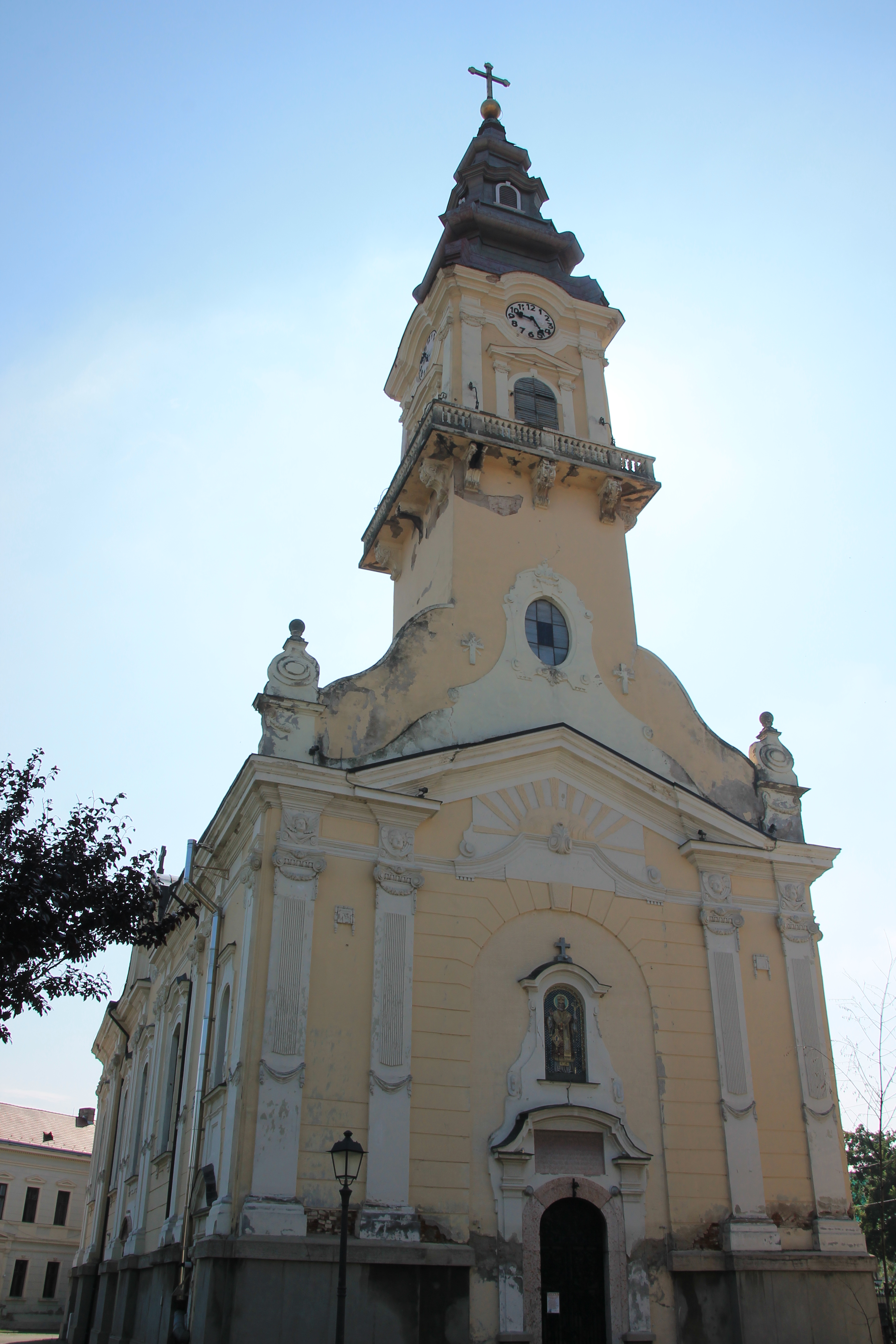
- Saint Nicholas Cathedral, Vršac

Location
- Territory: Serbian Banat
- Headquarters: Bishop's Palace, Vršac, Serbia

Information
- Denomination: Eastern Orthodox
- Sui iuris church: Serbian Orthodox Church
- Established: 1932
- Cathedral: Saint Nicholas Cathedral, Vršac
- Language: Church Slavonic, Serbian

Current leadership
- Bishop: Nikanor Bogunović

Map

Website
- Eparchy of Banat

The Eparchy of Banat (Serbian: Епархија банатска, romanized: Eparhija banatska) is a diocese (eparchy) of the Serbian Orthodox Church covering Banat region in northeastern Serbia.

The episcopal see is located at the Saint Nicholas Cathedral, Vršac. Its headquarters and bishop's residence, are also in Vršac, both located at the Bishop's Palace.

== History ==
During the Middle Ages, entire territory of modern Serbian Banat belonged to the Kingdom of Hungary, that had ambivalent attitudes towards the presence of Eastern Orthodox Christianity in its southern and eastern regions, depending on relations with the Byzantine Empire, and medieval Serbia. By the end of the 15th century, Serb presence in those regions was significantly enlarged by continuous migrations that were caused by Ottoman invasion of Serbian lands.

The Eparchy of Vršac was one of several eparchies created on the territory of Banat during the 16th century under the jurisdiction of the Serbian Patriarchate of Peć. By the time of the accession of Serbian patriarch Makarije I (1557), much of the Banat region was already conquered by the Ottoman Empire, who took over Timișoara in 1552. The region was organized as an Ottoman eyalet (province) named the Temeşvar Eyalet

During the Ottoman rule in the 16th and 17th centuries, Banat was mainly populated by Serbs (also called Rascians) in the west and Vlachs (Romanians) in the east. In some historical sources the entire region was thus referred to as Rascia, and in others as Wallachia. Both Serbs and Romanians in Banat were Orthodox Christians.

In 1594, at the beginning of the Long Turkish War, Serbs in Banat started an uprising against Ottoman rule. The local Romanians also participated in this uprising. Rebels took Vršac and various other towns in Banat and started negotiations with Prince of Transylvania. One of the leaders of the uprising was Serbian Orthodox Bishop Teodor.

During the Great Turkish War, Serbian patriarch Arsenije III sided with Austrians and appointed Spiridon Štibica as the new Bishop of Vršac in 1694. Austrian troops took over parts of Banat, and the Eparchy of Vršac was officially recognized as a diocese of the Serbian Orthodox Church by charter of emperor Leopold I in 1695. Under the Treaty of Karlowitz (1699) the Banat remained under Ottoman administration.

At the beginning of the Austro-Turkish War of 1716–18, when Prince Eugene of Savoy took the Banat region from the Ottomans, Serbian Bishop of Vršac was Mojsije Stanojević. He sided with the Austrians and secured official confirmation. After the Treaty of Passarowitz (1718), the region became a Habsburg province and was renamed as the Banat of Temeswar.

The Eparchy of Vršac at first went under the jurisdiction of the Metropolitanate of Belgrade. During the Austro-Turkish War (1737–1739), Serbian Patriarch Arsenije IV sided with the Austrians and made his residence in Sremski Karlovci. The Eparchy of Vršac remained under the jurisdiction of the Metropolitanate of Karlovci (after 1848 Patriarchate of Karlovci) until 1920, when a unified Serbian Patriarchate was re-created.

During the 18th and 19th centuries, the prominent bishops of Vršac were Jovan Đorđević, who became Metropolitan of Karlovci in 1769, and Josif Rajačić, who became Metropolitan of Karlovci in 1842 and Serbian Patriarch in 1848.

During the World War I, many Serbian Orthodox priests and parish councilors of the Eparchy of Vršac were persecuted, imprisoned or sent to concentration camps by the authorities of Austria-Hungary. After World War I and the creation of the Kingdom of Yugoslavia, its territory was united with other Serbian ecclesiastical provinces to form the unified Serbian Orthodox Church, a process completed in 1920. The Eparchy of Vršac was reorganized and renamed as the Eparchy of Banat in 1931.

During the World War II, the territory of the eparchy was occupied by forces of Nazi Germany from 1941 to 1944. German forces committed numerous atrocities against orthodox Serbs in Banat and also against local Jews and Gypsies. After the Liberation in 1944 and the establishment of new communist regime in Yugoslavia, the Eparchy of Banat was kept under constant political pressure, until the collapse of the communist one-party system (1988–1990).

== List of bishops ==
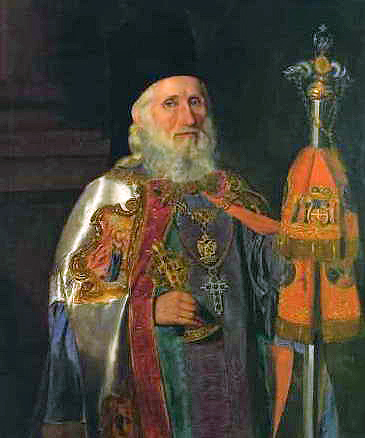
Serbian Patriarch Josif Rajačić, former Bishop of Vršac

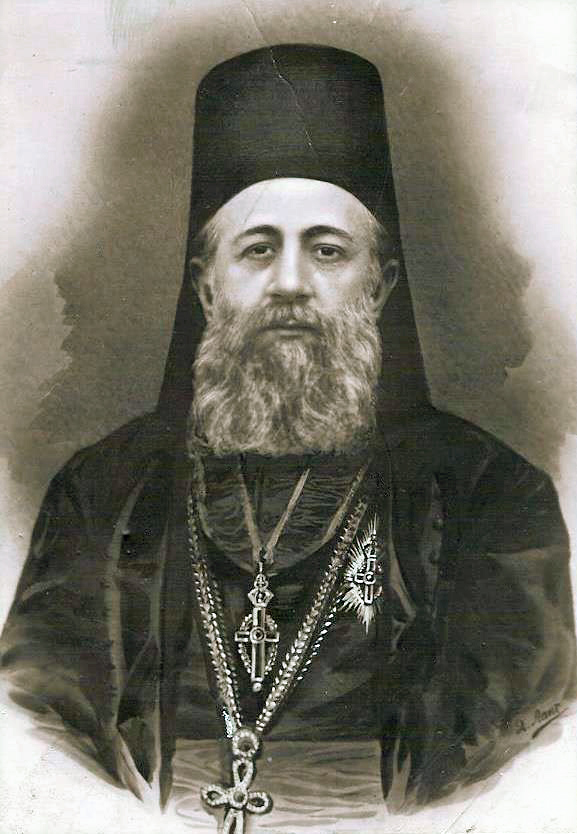
Bishop Georgije Letić

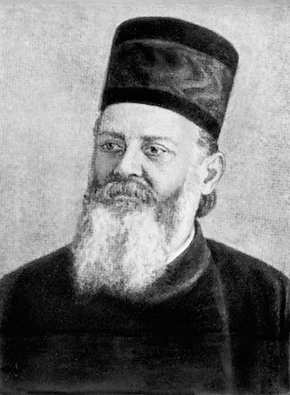
Bishop Vikentije Vujić

=== Bishops of Vršac ===
- Teodor (1594)
- Simeon (1619)
- Antonije (1622)
- Teodosije (1662)
- Spiridon Štibica (1694–1699)
- Mojsije Stanojević (1713–1726)
- Nikola Dimitrijević (1726–1728)
- Maksim Nestorović (1728–1738)
- Jeftimije Damjanović (1739)
- Isaije Antonović (1741–1748)
- Jovan Đorđević (1749–1769)
- Vikentije Popović-Hadžilovac (1774–1785)
- Josif Jovanović Šakabenta (1786–1805)
- Petar Jovanović Vidak (1806–1818)
- Maksim Manuilović (1829–1833)
- Josif Rajačić (1833–1842)
- Stefan Popović (1843–1849)
- Emilijan Kengelac (1853–1885)
- Nektarije Dimitrijević (1887–1895)
- Gavrilo Zmejanović (1896–1919)
- Ilarion Radović (1922–1929)

=== Bishops of Banat ===
- Georgije Letić (1931–1935)
- Irinej Ćirić (administrator) (1935–1936)
- Vikentije Vujić (1936–1939)
- Damaskin Grdanički (1939–1947)
- Visarion Kostić (1951–1979)
- Sava Vuković (administrator) (1980–1985)
- Amfilohije Radović (1985–1990)
- Atanasije Jevtić (1991–1992)
- Hrizostom Stolić (1992–2003)
- Nikanor Bogunović (2003–present)

== Notable monasteries ==
- Vojlovica
- Mesić
- Središte
- Bavanište
- Holy Trinity
- St. Melania the Roman
- Hajdučica

== Gallery ==
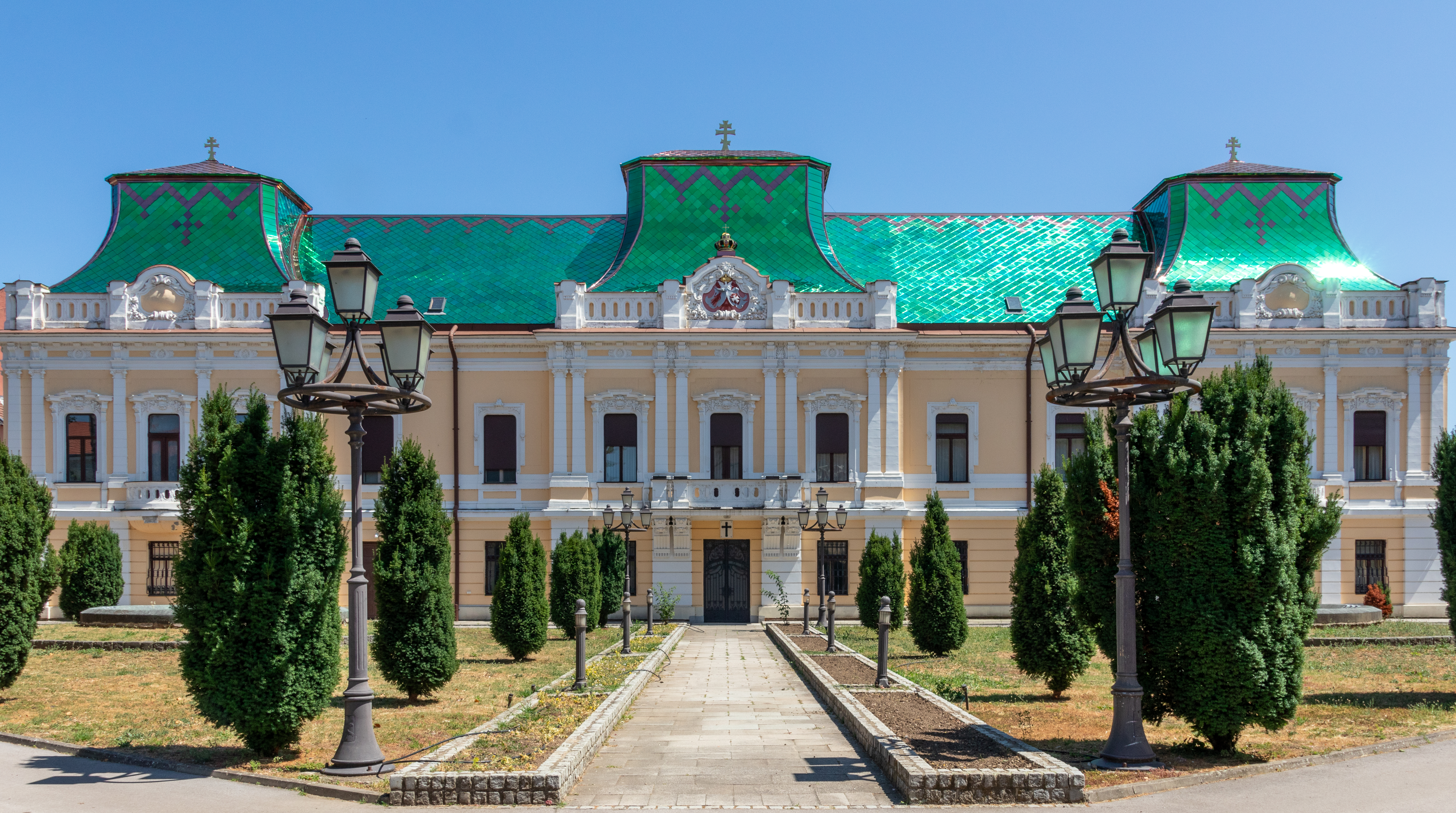
Bishop's Palace

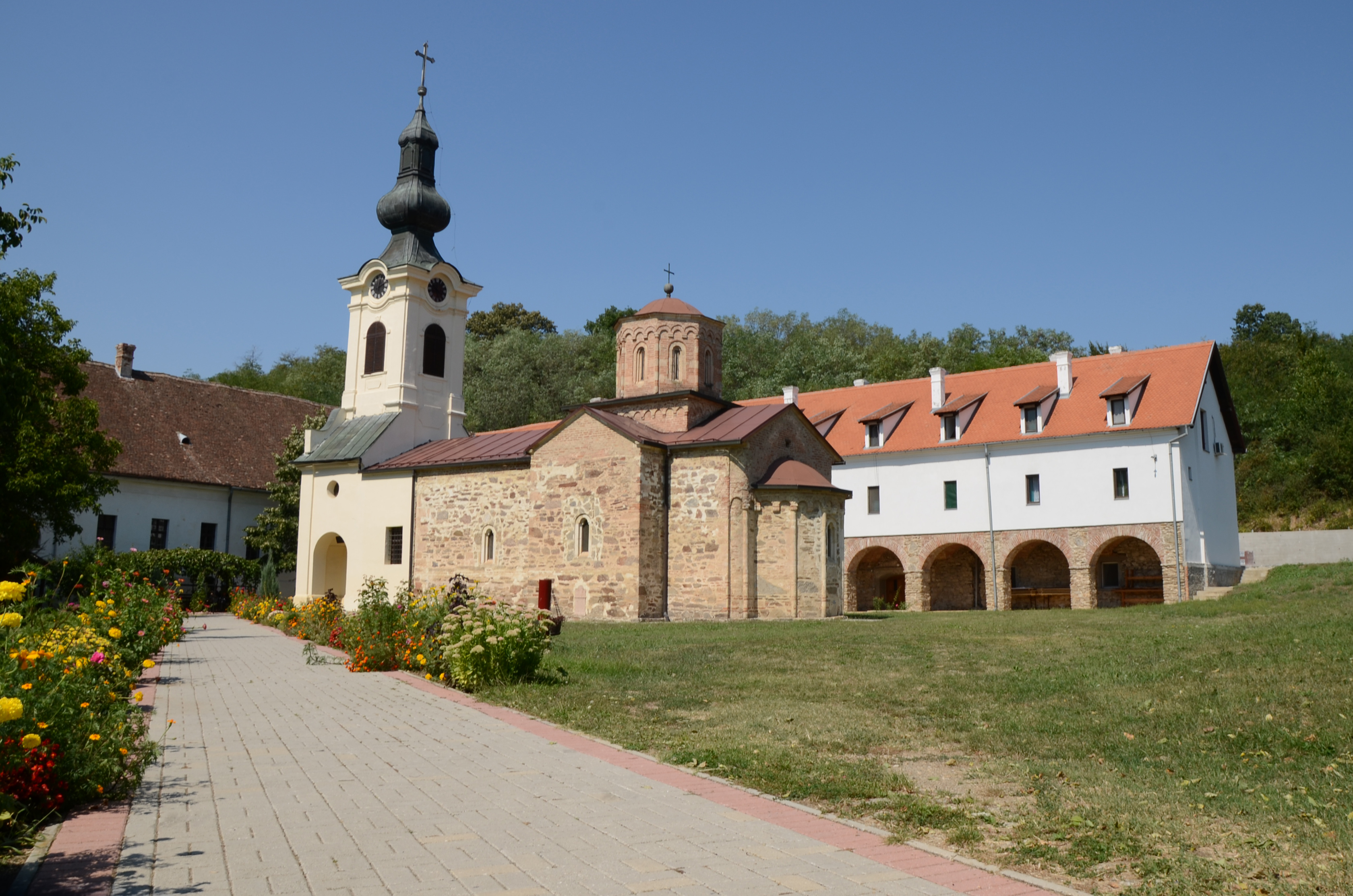
Mesić Monastery

== See also ==
- Eparchies and metropolitanates of the Serbian Orthodox Church

== Sources ==
- Baán, István (1999). "The Metropolitanate of Tourkia: The Organization of the Byzantine Church in Hungary in the Middle Ages". Byzanz und Ostmitteleuropa 950-1453. Wiesbaden: Harrassowitz Verlag. pp. 45–53.
- Bataković, Dušan T., ed. (2005). Histoire du peuple serbe [History of the Serbian People] (in French). Lausanne: L’Age d’Homme.
- Ćirković, Sima (2004). The Serbs. Malden: Blackwell Publishing. ISBN 9781405142915.
- Dabić, Vojin S. (2011). "The Habsburg-Ottoman War of 1716–1718 and Demographic Changes in the War-Afflicted Territories". The Peace of Passarowitz, 1718. West Lafayette: Purdue University Press. pp. 191–208.
- Dávid, Géza (1999). "The Eyalet of Temesvár in the Eighteenth Century". Oriente Moderno. 79 (18): 113–128.
- Fine, John Van Antwerp Jr. (1991) [1983]. The Early Medieval Balkans: A Critical Survey from the Sixth to the Late Twelfth Century. Ann Arbor, Michigan: University of Michigan Press.
- Fine, John Van Antwerp Jr. (1994) [1987]. The Late Medieval Balkans: A Critical Survey from the Late Twelfth Century to the Ottoman Conquest. Ann Arbor, Michigan: University of Michigan Press.
- Fodor, Pál; Dávid, Géza, eds. (2000). Ottomans, Hungarians, and Habsburgs in Central Europe: The Military Confines in the Era of Ottoman Conquest. leiden: Brill. ISBN 9004119078.
- Gavrilović, Slavko (1993). "Serbs in Hungary, Slavonia and Croatia in struggles against the Turks (15th–18th centuries)". Serbs in European Civilization. Belgrade: Nova, Serbian Academy of Sciences and Arts, Institute for Balkan Studies. pp. 41–54.
- Isailović, Neven G.; Krstić, Aleksandar R. (2015). "Serbian Language and Cyrillic Script as a Means of Diplomatic Literacy in South Eastern Europe in 15th and 16th Centuries" (PDF). Literacy Experiences concerning Medieval and Early Modern Transylvania. Cluj-Napoca: George Bariţiu Institute of History. pp. 185–195. Archived from the original on 2024-06-07.
- Krstić, Aleksandar R. (2017). "Which Realm will You Opt for? – The Serbian Nobility Between the Ottomans and the Hungarians in the 15th Century". State and Society in the Balkans Before and After Establishment of Ottoman Rule. Belgrade: Institute of History, Yunus Emre Enstitüsü Turkish Cultural Centre. pp. 129–163.
- Palffy, Geza (2001). "The Impact of the Ottoman rule on Hungary" (PDF). Hungarian Studies Review. 28 (1–2): 109–132.
- Sotirović, Vladislav B. (2011). "The Serbian Patriarchate of Peć in the Ottoman Empire: The First Phase (1557–94)" (PDF). Serbian Studies. 25 (2): 143–169. Archived from the original (PDF) on 2016-08-10.
- Stojkovski, Boris; Ivanić, Ivana; Spăriosu, Laura (2018). "Serbian-Romanian Relations in the Middle Ages until the Ottoman Conquest" (PDF). Transylvanian Review. 27 (2): 217–229. Archived from the original (PDF) on 2020-06-02.
- Točanac-Radović, Isidora (2018). "Belgrade - Seat of the Archbishopric and Metropolitanate (1718–1739)". Belgrade 1521-1867. Belgrade: The Institute of History. pp. 155–167.
