= Orešac =

Orešac may refer to:

- Orešac (Vršac), a village in the municipality of Vršac, Serbia
- Orešac (Knjaževac), a village in the municipality of Knjaževac, Serbia
- Orešac, Croatia, a village in the municipality of Suhopolje
