= Vršac =

City in the province of Vojvodina, Serbia

Vršac Вршац (Serbian) Vârșeț (Romanian) Versec (Hungarian)
- City
- City of Vršac
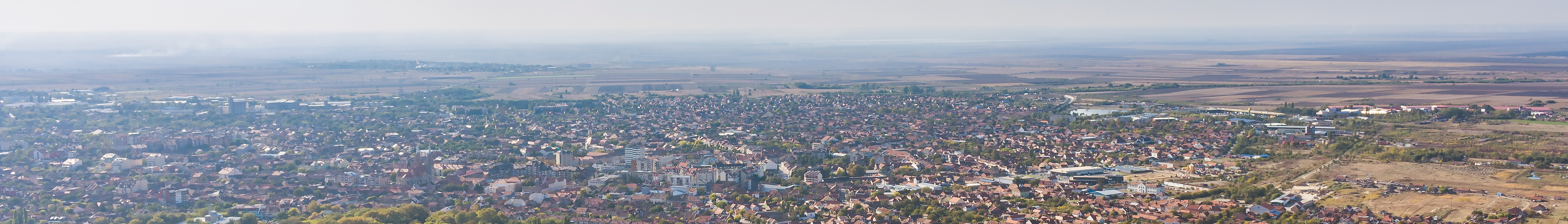
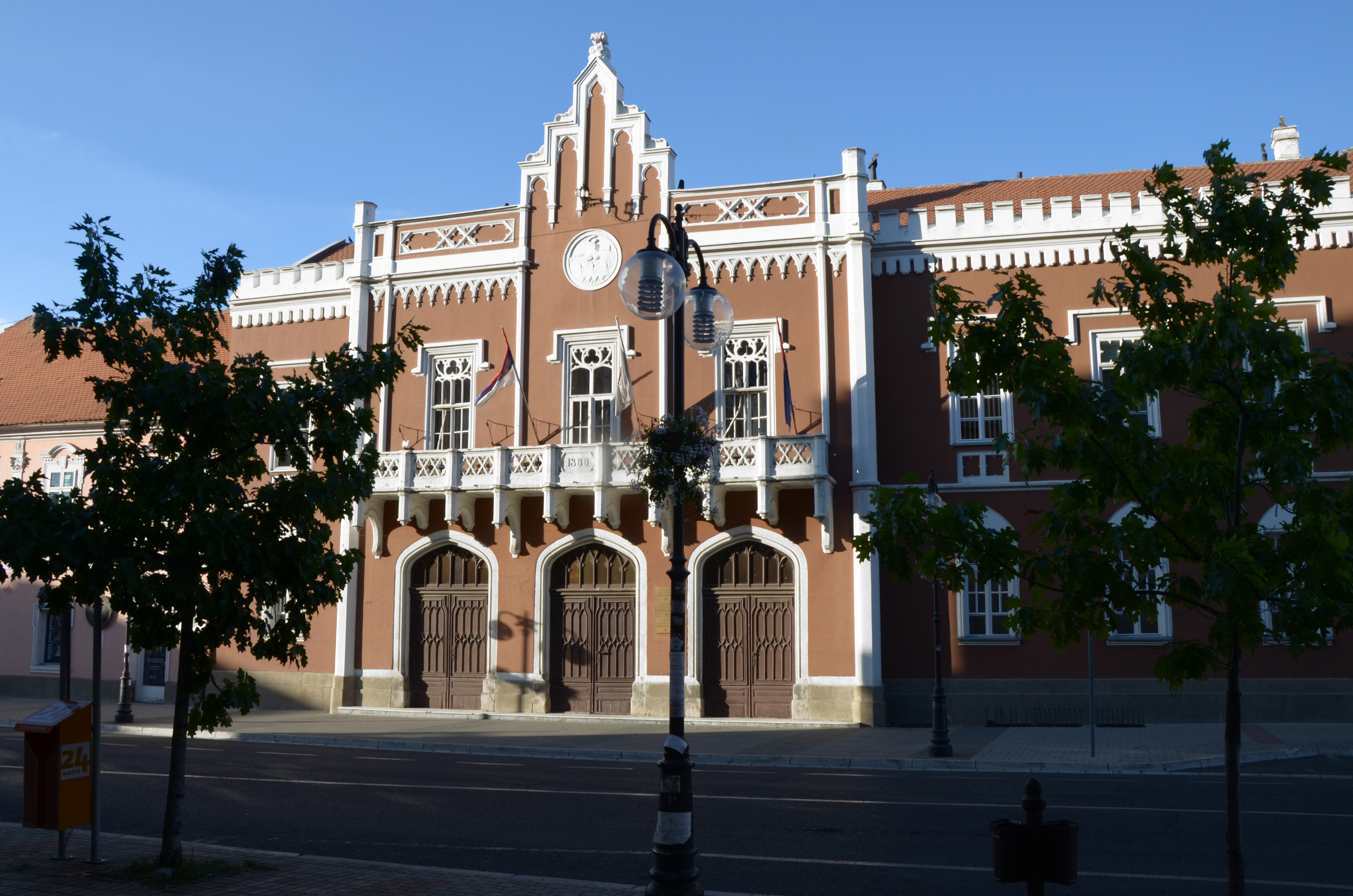
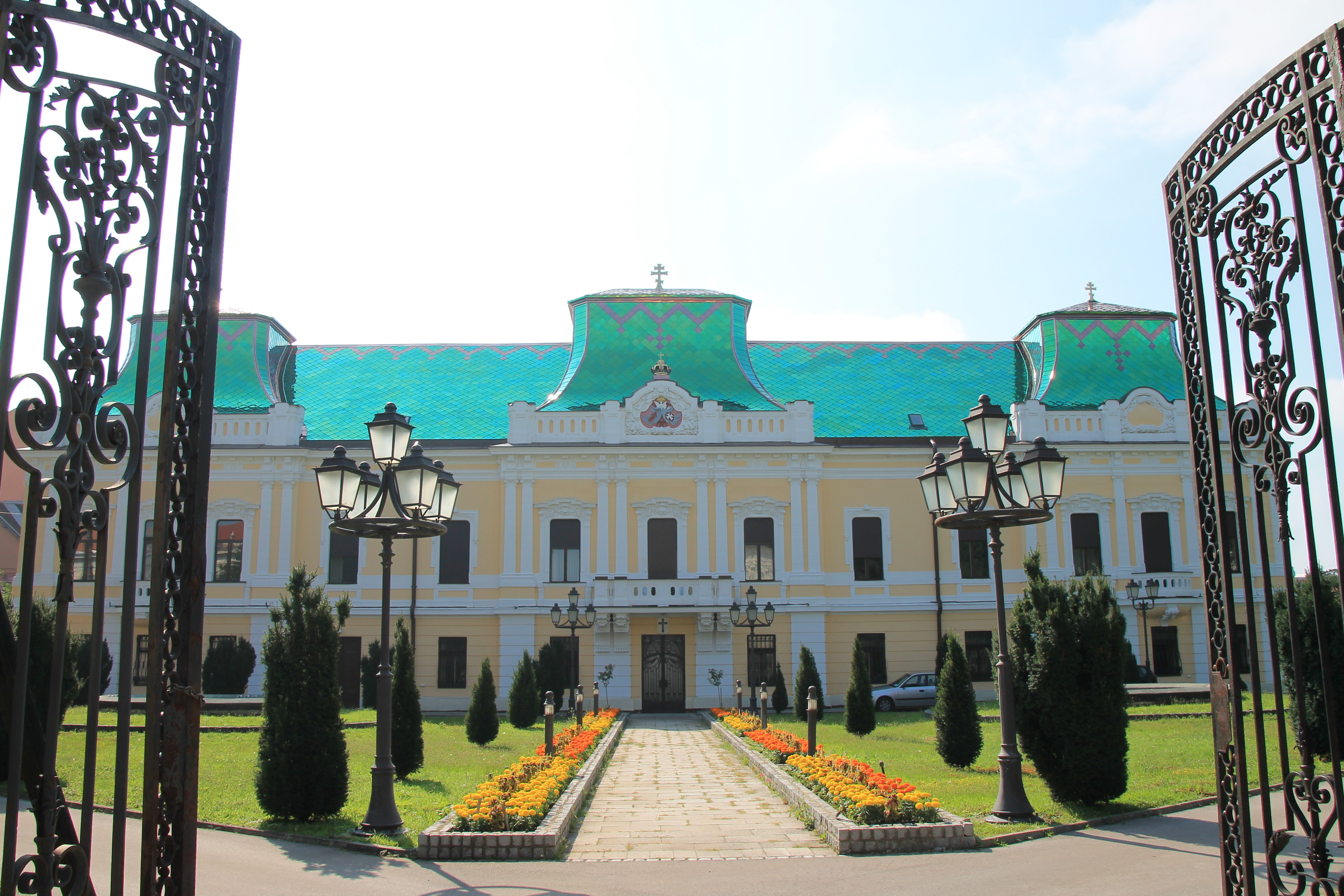
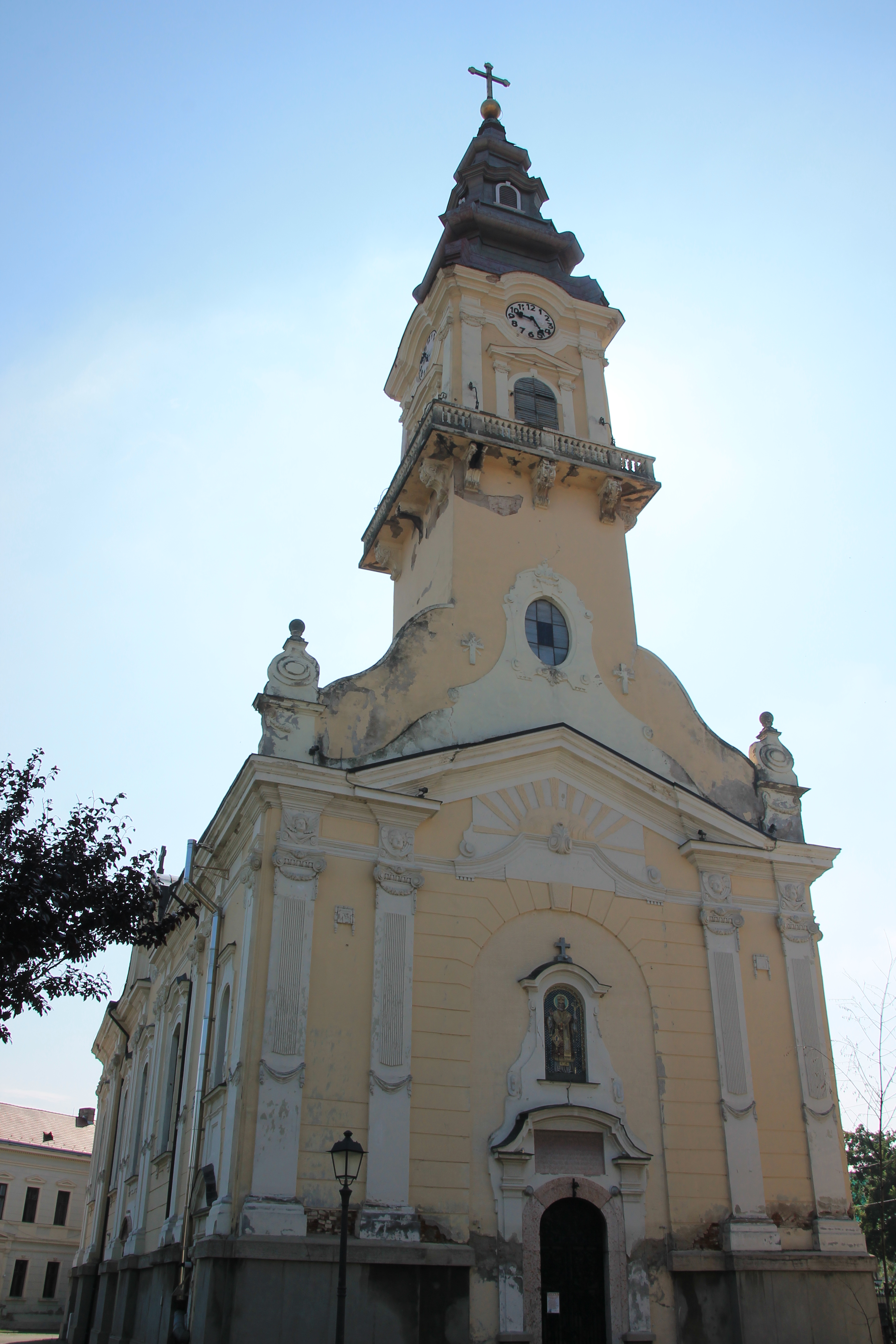
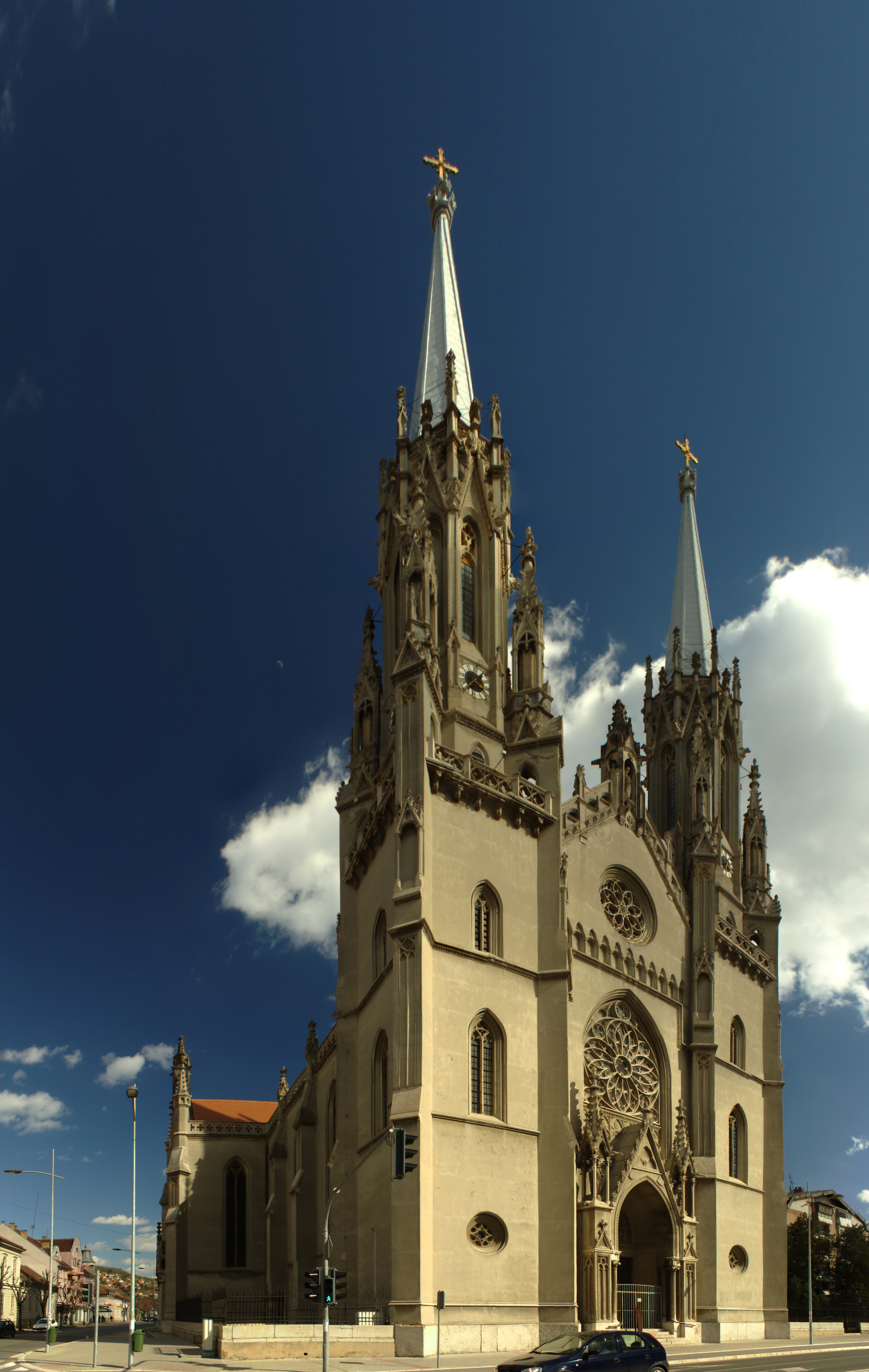
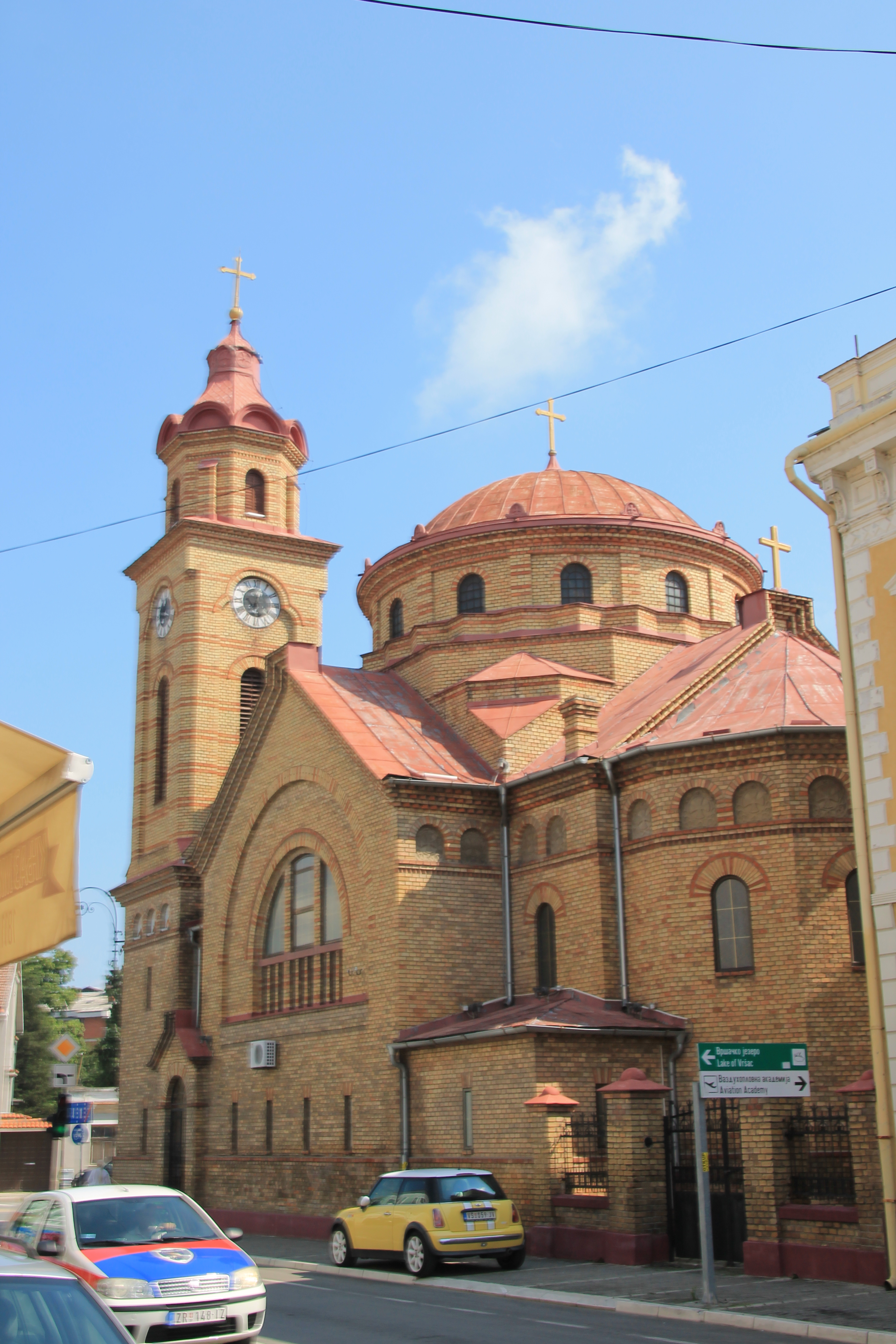
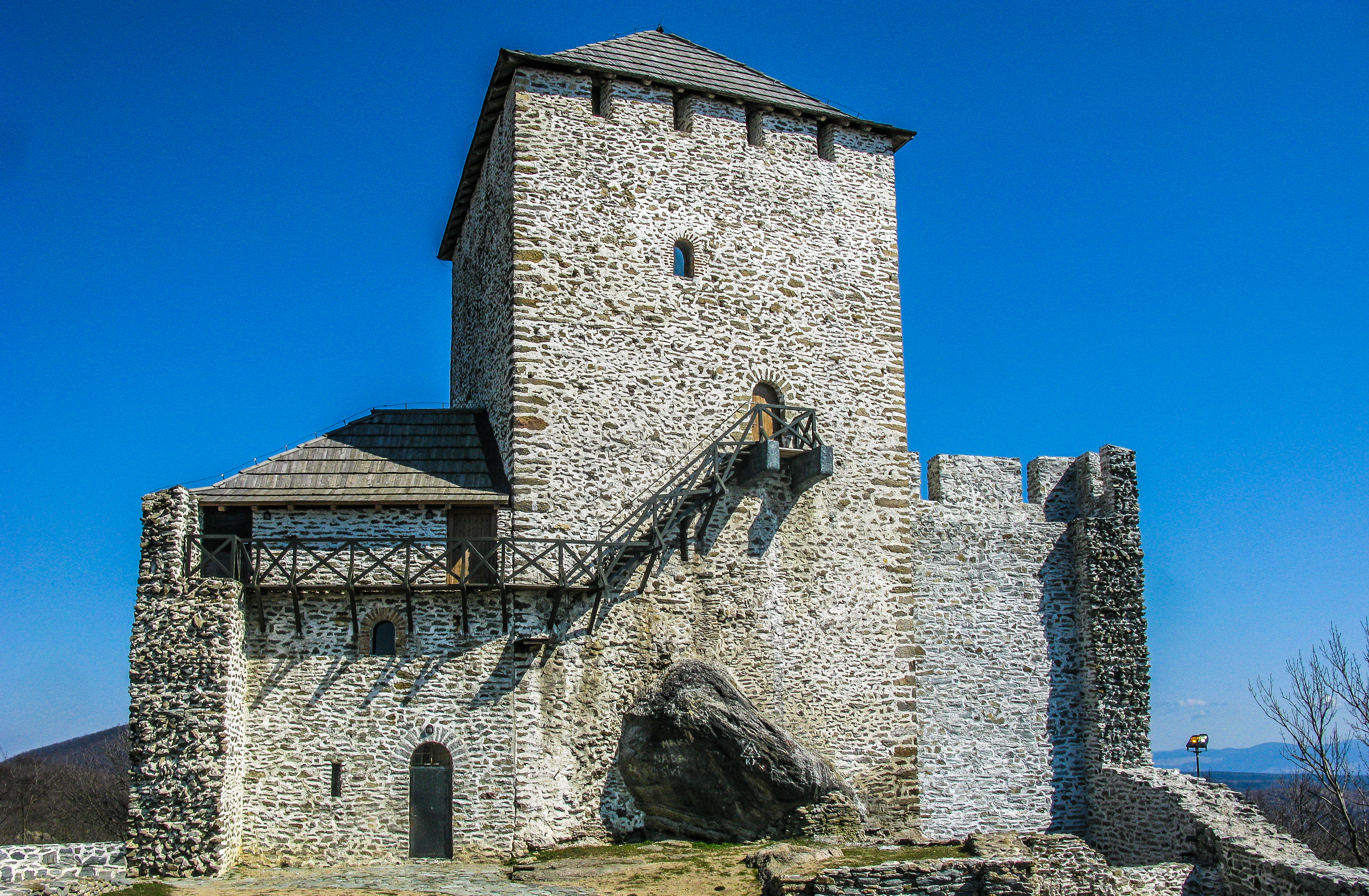
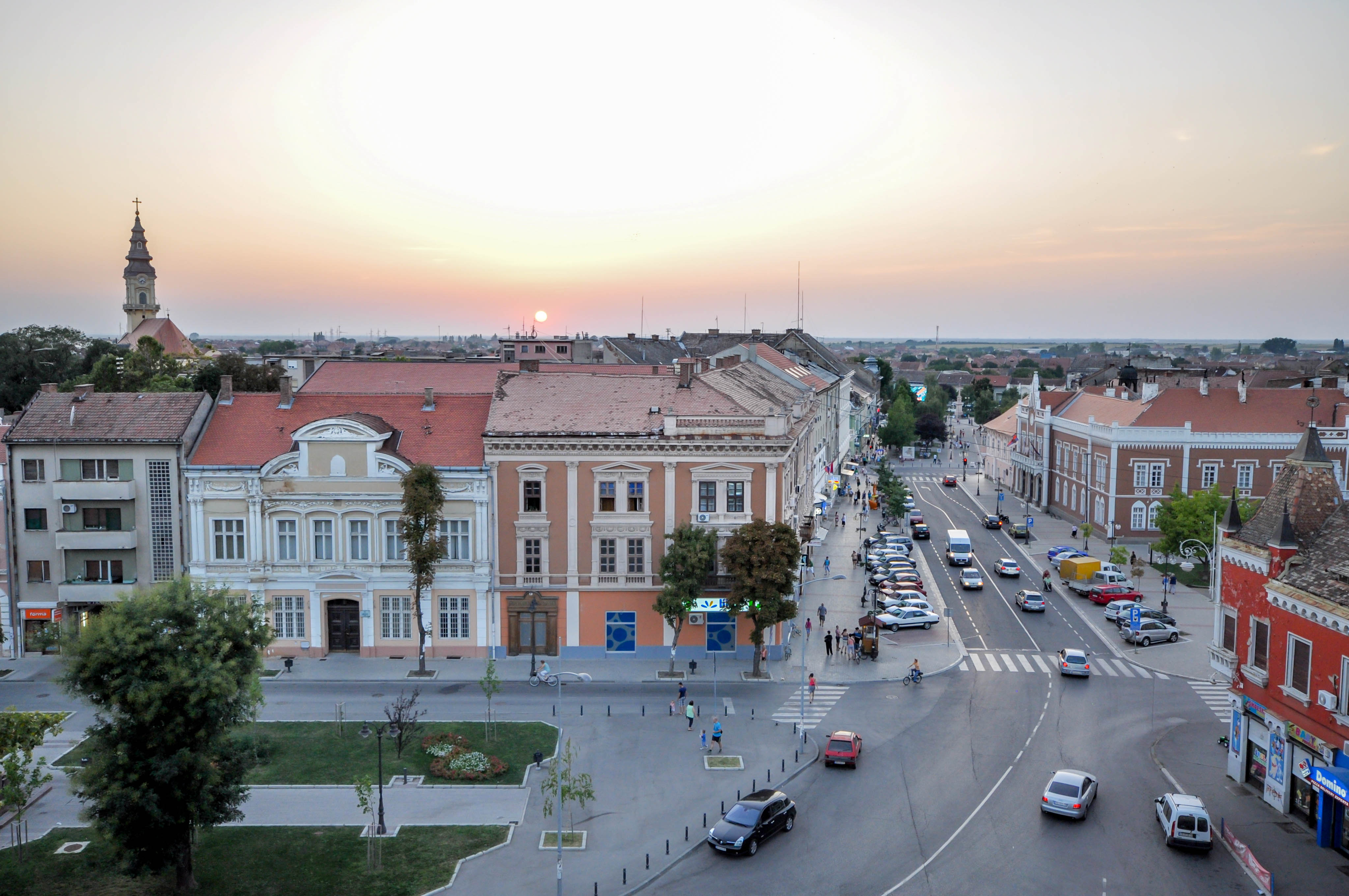
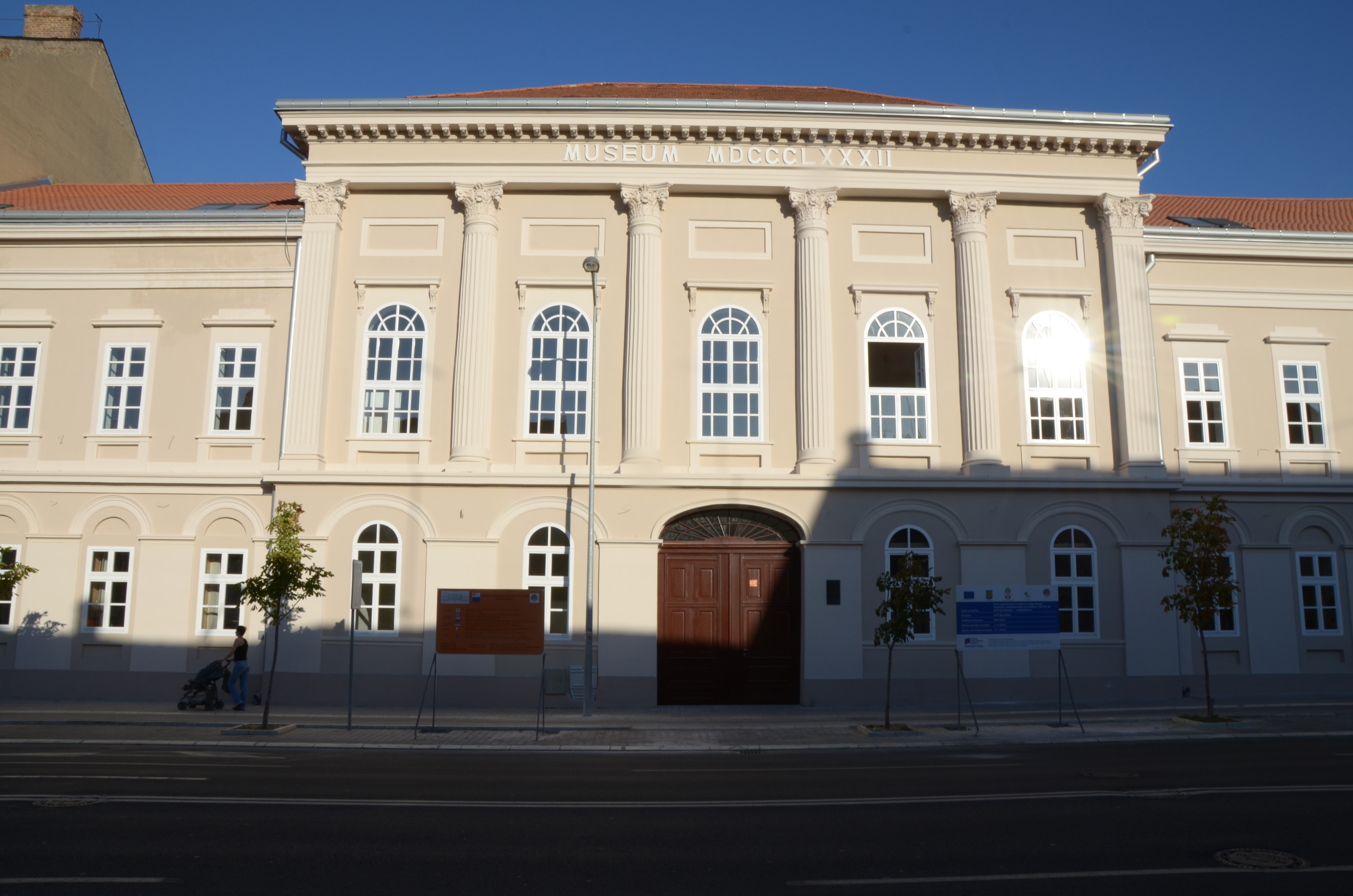
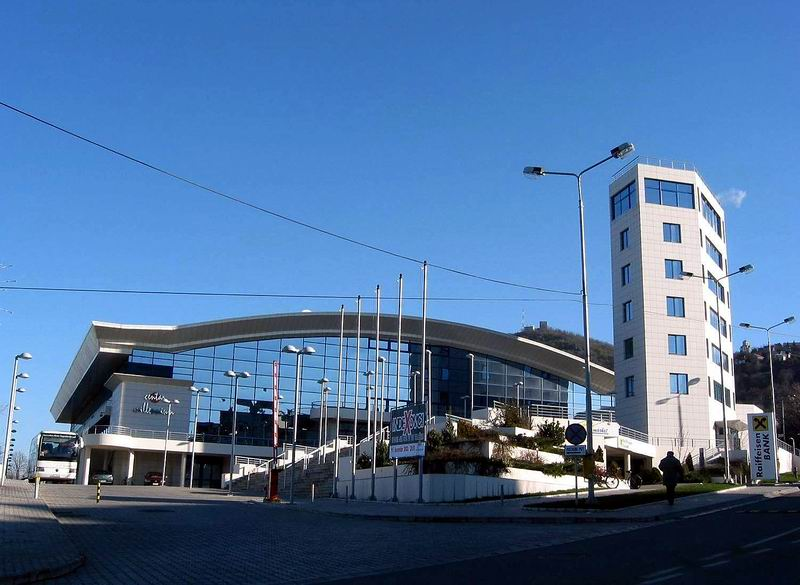
- Panorama of Vršac Vršac City Hall Bishop's Palace Saint Nicholas Cathedral Church of Saint Gerhard de Sangredo Cathedral of the Ascension of the Lord Vršac Castle Vršac City Centre Konkordija building Millennium Centar

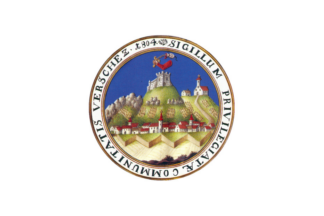
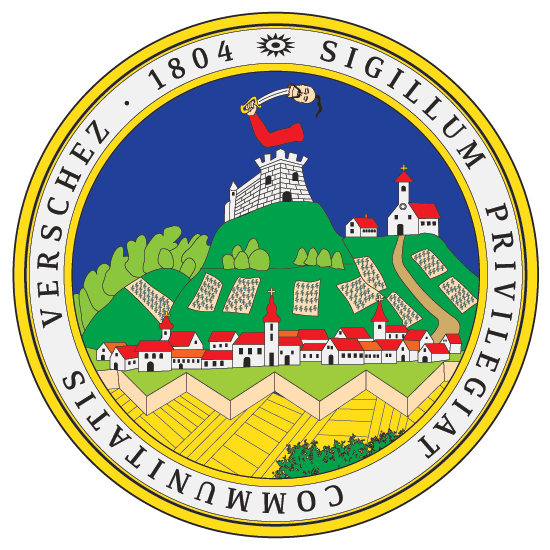
- Flag Coat of arms

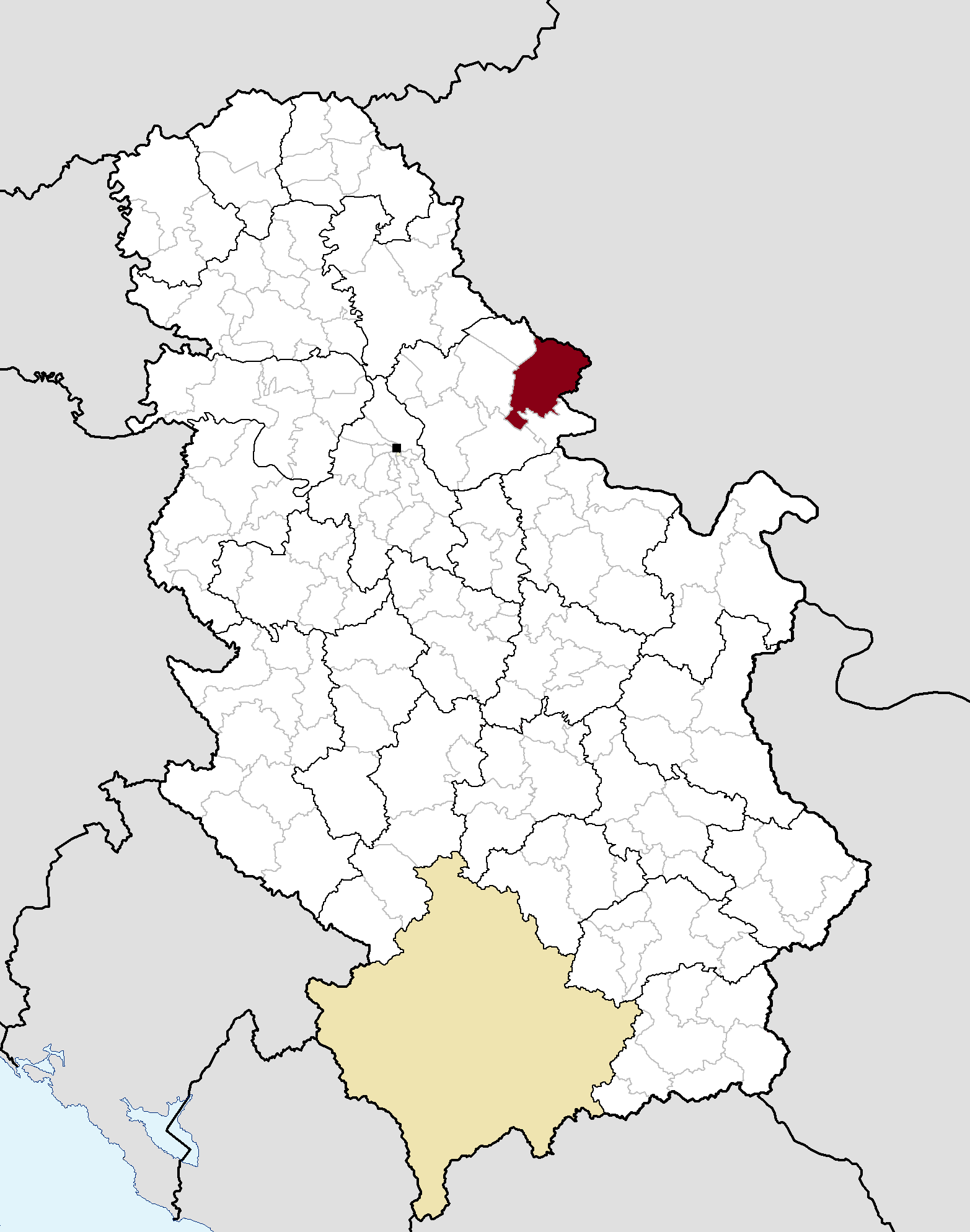
- Location of Vršac within Serbia
- Coordinates: 45°07′14″N 21°17′49″E
- Country: Serbia
- Province: Vojvodina
- District: South Banat
- City status: March 2016

Government
  - Mayor: Dragana Mitrović (SNS)

Area
  - Rank: 4th in Serbia
  - Area: 1,324 km^{2} (511 sq mi)
- Elevation: 93 m (305 ft)

Population (2022)
  - Urban: 31,946
  - Rank: 30th in Serbia
  - Metro: 45,462
- Demonym(s): Vrščani, Vrščanka (sr)
- Time zone: UTC+1 (CET)
  - Summer (DST): UTC+2 (CEST)
- Postal code: 26300
- Area code: +381(0)13
- ISO 3166 code: SRB
- Car plates: VŠ
- Official languages: Serbian together with Romanian and Hungarian
- Website: www.vrsac.org.rs www.vrsac.com

Vršac (Serbian Cyrillic: Вршац, pronounced [ʋr̩̂ʃat͡s]; Hungarian: Versec; Romanian: Vârșeț) is a city in the province of Vojvodina, Serbia. As of 2022, the city urban area had a population of 31,946, while the city administrative area had 45,462 inhabitants. It is located in the geographical region of Banat.

== Etymology ==
The name Vršac is of Serbian origin, ultimately deriving from Proto-Slavic *vьrxъ, meaning "summit".

In Serbian, the city is known as Вршац or Vršac, in Romanian as Vârșeț or Vîrșeț, in Hungarian as Versec or Versecz, in German as Werschetz, and in Turkish as Virşac or Verşe.

== History ==
The uniqueness of Vršac is reflected in the fact that it has been inhabited since the dawn of the first cultures. Thus, the oldest traces of human presence in Banat originate precisely from Vršac, since individual finds of Paleolithic flint tools from the middle and younger Paleolithic, Mousterian and Aurignacian cultures were found on the slopes of the Vršac Mountains. The collection of over 5,000 finds from this period constitutes the largest collection of Paleolithic material in the Balkans. There are traces of human settlement from the Palaeolithic and Neolithic periods. Remains from two types of Neolithic cultures have been discovered in the area: an older one, known as the Starčevo culture, and a more recent one, known as the Vinča culture. Near Vršac there are Vatin circles that were estimated to belong to the Vinča culture. From the Bronze Age, there are traces of the Vatin culture and Vršac culture, while from the Iron Age, there are traces of the Hallstatt culture and La Tène culture (which is largely associated with the Celts).

The Agathyrsi (people of mixed Scythian-Thracian origin) are the first people known to have lived in this region. Later, the region was inhabited by Getae and Dacians. It belonged to the Dacian kingdoms of Burebista and Decebalus, and then to the Roman Empire from 102 to 271 AD. Archaeologists have found traces of ancient Dacian and Roman settlements in the city. Later, the region belonged to the Empire of the Huns, the Gepid and Avar kingdoms, and the Bulgarian Empire.

The Slavs settled in this region in the 6th century, and the Slavic tribe known as the Abodrites (Bodriči) was recorded as living in the area. The Slavs from the region were Christianized during the rule of the duke Ahtum in the 11th century. When duke Ahtum was defeated by the Kingdom of Hungary, the region was included in the latter state.

Information about the early history of the town is scant. According to Serbian historians, medieval Vršac was founded and inhabited by Serbs in 1425, although it was under administration of the Kingdom of Hungary. The original name of the town is unknown. There are several theories that its first name was Vers, Verbeč, Veršet or Vegenje, but these theories are not confirmed. The name of the town appears for the first time in 1427 in the form Podvršan. The Hungarian 12th century chronicle known as Gesta Hungarorum mention the castle of Vrscia in Banat, which belonged to Romanian duke Glad in the 9th century. According to some interpretations, Vrscia is identified with modern Vršac, while according to other opinions, it is identified with Orşova. According to some claims, the town was at first in the possession of the Hungarian kings, and later became property of a Hungarian aristocrat, Miklós Peréyi, ban of Severin. In the 15th century, the town was in the possession of the Serbian despot Đurađ Branković. According to some claims, it was donated to the despot by Hungarian king Sigismund in 1411. According to other sources, Vršac fortress was built by Đurađ Branković after the fall of Smederevo.

The Ottomans destroyed the town in the 16th century, but it was soon rebuilt under Ottoman administration. In 1590/91, the Ottoman garrison in Vršac fortress was composed of one aga, two Ottoman officers and 20 Serb mercenaries. The town was seat of the local Ottoman authorities and of the Serbian bishop. In this time, its population was composed of Muslims and Serbs.

In 1594, the Serbs in the Banat started a large uprising against Ottoman rule, and Vršac region was centre of this uprising. The leader of the uprising was Teodor Nestorović, the bishop of Vršac. Teodor organized the revolt with Sava Ban and voivode Velja Mironić. An important man was Janko Lugošan, called Halabura, who got control of the Vršac Castle after defeating Arslan Beg, the aga, in a duel. The size of this uprising is illustrated by the verse from one Serbian national song: "Sva se butum zemlja pobunila, Šest stotina podiglo se sela, Svak na cara pušku podigao!" ("The whole land has rebelled, a six hundred villages arose, everybody pointed his gun against the emperor").

The Serb rebels bore flags with the image of Saint Sava, thus the rebellion had a character of a holy war. The Grand Vizier Koca Sinan Pasha of Temeşvar Eyalet that lead the Ottoman army ordered that green flag of Muhammed should be brought from Damascus to confront this flag with image of Saint Sava. Furthermore, the Koca Sinan Pasha also burned the mortal remains of Saint Sava in Belgrade, as a revenge to the Serbs. Eventually, the uprising was crushed and most of the Serbs from the region escaped to Transylvania fearing the Ottoman retaliation. However, since the Banat region became deserted after this, which alarmed the Ottoman authorities who needed people in this fertile land, the authorities promised to spare everyone who came back. The Serb population came back, but the amnesty did not apply to the leader of the rebellion, Bishop Teodor Nestorović, who was flayed as a punishment. The Banat uprising was one of the three largest uprisings in Serbian history and the largest before the First Serbian Uprising led by Karađorđe.

In 1716, Vršac passed from Ottoman to Habsburg control, and the Muslim population fled the town. In this time, Vršac was mostly populated by Serbs, and in the beginning of the Habsburg rule, its population numbered 75 houses. Soon, German colonists started to settle here. They founded a new settlement known as Werschetz, which was located near the old (Serbian) Vršac. Serbian Vršac was governed by a knez, and German Werschetz was governed by a Schultheiß (mayor). The name of the first Serbian knez in Vršac in 1717 was Jovan Crni. In 1795, the two towns, Serbian Vršac and German Werschetz, were officially joined into one single settlement, in which the authority was shared between Serbs and Germans. It was occupied by Ottomans between 1787 and 1788 during Russo-Turkish War (1787–1792).

The 1848/1849 revolution disrupted the good relations between Serbs and Germans, since Serbs fought on the side of the Austrian authorities and Germans fought on the side of the Hungarian revolutionaries. In 1848–1849, the town was part of autonomous Serbian Vojvodina, and from 1849 to 1860, it was part of the Voivodeship of Serbia and Temes Banat, a separate Austrian province. After the abolition of the voivodship, Vršac was included in Temes County of the Kingdom of Hungary, which became one of two autonomous parts of Austria-Hungary in 1867. The town was also a district seat. In 1910, the population of the town numbered 27,370 inhabitants, of whom 13,556 spoke German language, 8,602 spoke Serbian, 3,890 spoke Hungarian and 879 spoke Romanian. On the other side, the Diocese of Vršac numbered 260.000 Romanians in 1847.

From 1918, the town was part of the newly formed Kingdom of Serbs, Croats and Slovenes (later renamed Yugoslavia). According to the 1921 census, speakers of German language were most numerous in the town, while the 1931 census recorded 13,425 speakers of Yugoslav languages and 11,926 speakers of German language. During the Axis occupation (1941–1944), Vršac was part of autonomous Banat region within the area governed by the Military Administration in Serbia. Many Danube Swabians collaborated with the Nazi authorities and many men were conscripted into the Waffen SS. Letters were sent to German men requesting their "voluntary service" or they would face court martial. In 1944, one part of Vršac citizens of German ethnicity left from the city, together with defeated German army. Those who remained in Vršac were sent to local communist prison camps, where some of them died from disease and malnutrition. According to some claims, some were tortured or killed by the partisans. Since 1944 when it was liberated by the Red Army's 46th Army, the town was part of the new Socialist Yugoslavia. After prison camps were dissolved (in 1948) and Yugoslav citizenship was returned to the Germans, the remaining German population left Yugoslavia. Homes that had been in their families for decades were simply taken over by the Serbs.

Vršac was granted city status in February 2016.

== Inhabited places ==
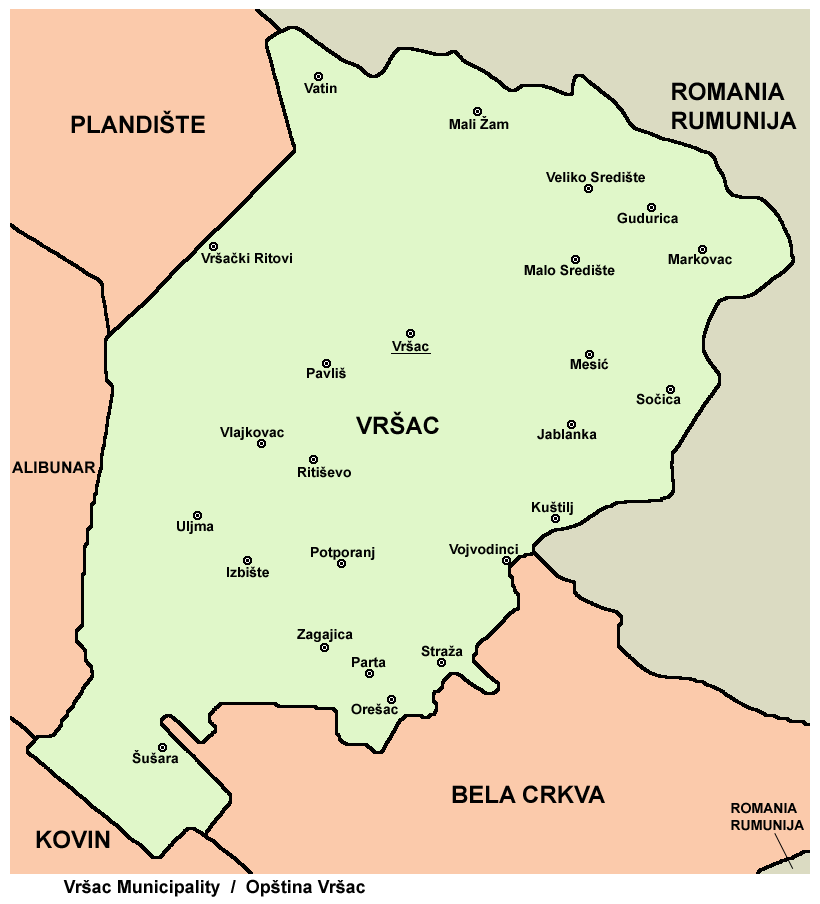
Map of the city of Vršac

The city of Vršac includes the settlement of Vršac and the following villages:

- Vatin
- Veliko Središte
- Vlajkovac
- Vojvodinci (Romanian: Voivodinț)
- Vršački Ritovi
- Gudurica
- Zagajica
- Izbište
- Jablanka (Romanian: Iabuca)
- Kuštilj (Romanian: Coștei)
- Mali Žam (Romanian: Jamu Mic)
- Malo Središte (Romanian: Srediștea Mică)
- Markovac (Romanian: Mărcovăț, Mărculești))
- Mesić (Romanian: Mesici)
- Orešac (Romanian: Oreșaț)
- Pavliš (Romanian: Păuliș)
- Parta (Romanian Parța)
- Potporanj
- Ritiševo (Romanian: Râtișor)
- Sočica (Romanian: Sălcița)
- Straža (Romanian: Straja)
- Uljma
- Šušara (Hungarian: Fejértelep)

Note: For the places with Romanian and Hungarian ethnic majorities, the names are also given in the language of the concerned ethnic group.

== Demographics ==
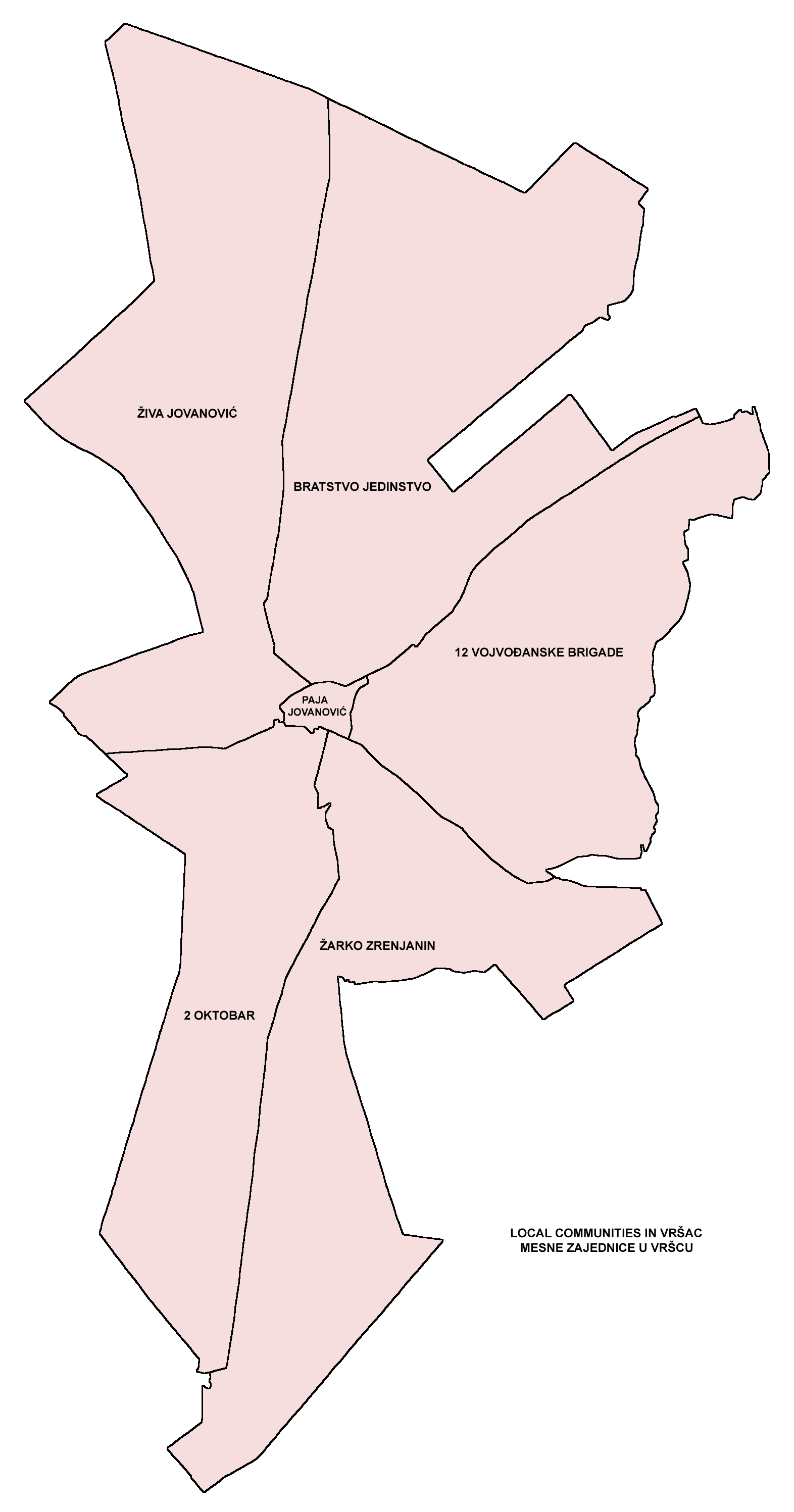
Map of local communities in urban Vršac

Historical population
Year	Pop.	±% p.a.
1948	51,792	—
1953	55,594	+1.43%
1961	61,284	+1.23%
1971	60,528	−0.12%
1981	61,005	+0.08%
1991	58,228	−0.46%
2002	54,369	−0.62%
2011	52,026	−0.49%

According to the 2011 census, the total population of the city of Vršac was 52,026 inhabitants.

=== Ethnic groups ===
Within the city, the settlements with a Serb ethnic majority are: Vršac (the city itself), Vatin, Veliko Središte, Vlajkovac, Vršački Ritovi, Gudurica, Zagajica, Izbište, Pavliš, Parta, Potporanj, and Uljma. The settlements with a Romanian ethnic majority are: Vojvodinci, Jablanka, Kuštilj, Mali Žam, Malo Središte, Markovac, Mesić, Ritiševo, Sočica, and Straža. Šušara has a Hungarian ethnic majority (Székelys colonised from Bukovina during the World War I), while Orešac is an ethnically mixed settlement with a Romanian plurality.

Vršac is the seat of the Serb Orthodox Eparchy of Banat. Some notable Serb cultural-artistic societies in Vršac are "Laza Nančić", "Penzioner" and "Grozd". The city's Romanian minority has a Romanian-language theater, schools and a museum. Romanian-language instruction takes place in some kindergartens, elementary schools, high schools and one teachers' university. The cultural organization and folklore group "Luceafarul" hold many cultural events in Vršac and nearby Romanian-populated villages. In 2005, Romania opened a consulate in Vršac.

The population of the city (52,026 people) is composed of the following ethnic groups (2011 census):

Ethnic group	Population	%
Serbs	37,595	72.26%
Romanians	5,420	10.42%
Hungarians	2,263	4.35%
Roma	1,368	2.63%
Macedonians	472	0.91%
Yugoslavs	302	0.58%
Others	4,606	8.85%
Total	52,026	

== Economy and industry ==
Vršac is a city famous for well-developed industry, especially pharmaceuticals, wine and beer, confectioneries and textiles. The leading pharmaceutical company in Vršac (and nationwide) is the Hemofarm, which helped start the city's Technology Park.

Vršac is considered to be one of the most significant centres of agriculture in the region of southern Banat, which is the southern part of the province of Vojvodina. It is mainly because it has 54,000 hectares of arable and extremely fertile land.

The following table gives a preview of the total number of registered people employed in legal entities per their core activity (as of 2022):

Activity	Total
Agriculture, forestry and fishing	364
Mining and quarrying	2
Manufacturing	4,763
Electricity, gas, steam and air conditioning supply	47
Water supply; sewerage, waste management and remediation activities	593
Construction	388
Wholesale and retail trade, repair of motor vehicles and motorcycles	1,813
Transportation and storage	668
Accommodation and food services	536
Information and communication	222
Financial and insurance activities	203
Real estate activities	44
Professional, scientific and technical activities	449
Administrative and support service activities	310
Public administration and defense; compulsory social security	668
Education	938
Human health and social work activities	1,545
Arts, entertainment and recreation	210
Other service activities	160
Individual agricultural workers	465
Total	14,388

== Transportation ==
State Road 10 (which is part of European route E70) connects Vršac to Belgrade and to the nearby border with Romania.

Vršac is also connected to Belgrade by the Srbija voz railway line 44. Trains to Timișoara are available from Moravița.

== Main sights ==
=== Vršac Castle ===
The symbol of the town is the Vršac Castle (Vršačka kula), which dates back to the mid-15th century and was used until 1522. It stands at the top of the hill (399m) overlooking Vršac.

There are two theories about the origin of this fortress. According to the Turkish traveller, Evliya Çelebi, the fortress was built by the Serbian despot Đurađ Branković. The historians consider that Branković built the fortress after the fall of Smederevo in 1439. The fortress in its construction had some architectural elements similar to those in the fortress of Smederevo or in the fortress around monastery Manasija.

The other theory claim that Vršac Castle is a remain of the medieval fortress known as Erdesumulu (Hungarian: Érdsomlyó or Érsomlyó, Serbian: Erd-Šomljo / Ерд-Шомљо or Šomljo / Шомљо). However, the other sources do not identify Erdesumulu with Vršac, but claim that these two were separate settlements and that location of town and fortress of Erdesumulu was further to the east, on the Karaš River, in present-day Romanian Banat.

=== Bishop's Palace ===
The palace is the official residence of the Bishop of the Eparchy of Banat of the Serbian Orthodox Church and was built between 1750 and 1757.

=== House of Jovan Sterija Popović ===
The birth house of Jovan Sterija Popović is located in Vršac and it was built in 1868. He was a Serbian writer and one of the leading intellectuals of his time.

=== Monasteries ===
There are two Serbian Orthodox monasteries in the city:

- Mesić monastery from the 13th century
- Središte monastery which was built in the late 15th century by Despot Jovan Brankovic

=== Churches ===
- Saint Nicholas Cathedral, Serbian Orthodox cathedral, completed in 1728.
- Church of the Assumption of the Theotokos, Serbian Orthodox church
- Cathedral of the Ascension of the Lord, Romanian Orthodox cathedral, completed in 1912.
- Church of Saint Gerhard de Sangredo, largest Roman Catholic church in Serbia, completed in 1863.
- Apostolic Christian Church of Nazarene, Protestant church, completed in the early 1900s.

=== Museums ===
There are three museums in Vršac:

- Pharmacy on Stairs - The first and the oldest pharmacy in the town, founded in 1784. Other than a well-preserved collection of pharmaceutical equipment, there's a collection of stuffed animals, created at the end of the 19th and the beginning of the 20th century.
- Concordia Building - Originally a hotel, it was erected in 1847. It later served as a restaurant and today hosts the main museum of the town.
- Vršac Castle - The interior of the castle was transformed into the museum, which is open for visitors on weekends, from April until October.

=== Vršac vineyards ===
The region around Vršac is famed for its vineyards. The "Dani berbe grožđa" ("Grape Ball") is held in Vršac every September.

=== City Park ===
At the end of the 17th century, the famous Aga, to whom the attribute "good" was added, because he behaved culturally and did not mistreat the people of Vršac at that time, formed Aga's garden and laid the foundations of what is today the City Park. Aga loved nature and used his position to decorate his garden as much as possible. However, in the thirties of the 18th century, this area, as a noble estate with the right of inheritance, was awarded by the Palace Chamber to Siegfried von Scherübl, while the credit for the further development of the park as a whole is attributed to his son Johann, when the park became "Šeriblov majur" a kind of arboretum, of rare plants that could resist the microclimate of Vršac. After Siegfried's death (1795) due to outstanding debts, "Šeriblov majur" was bought at an auction on January 15, 1797 by the Municipality of Vršac, so that in 1817, when Vršac was declared a free royal city, the name "Gradski Majur" came into use, and immediately before the Hungarian Revolution (1848) it was changed to "City Park". The park is six hectares in size and is under state protection as a monument of garden architecture.

=== City Lake ===
On the edge of Vršac there is an artificial lake, which represents an oasis on hot summer days. The lake has an area of about 32,000 square meters

== Sports ==
Founded only in 2007, OFK Vršac is the local football team that competes in Serbia's second tier.

== Notable residents ==
- Marie von Augustin (1807–1886), Austrian writer (de)
- Dragiša Brašovan (1887–1965), Serbian modernist architect
- Robert Hammerstiel (born 1933), painter, artist
- Ferenc Herczeg (1863–1954), Hungarian writer
- Paja Jovanović (1859–1957), famous Serbian painter
- Ivan Radović (1894–1973), painter and tennis player
- Boris Kostić (1887–1963), chess player
- Boban Marjanović (1988–), Serbian basketball player, Actor in John Wick III
- Felix Milleker, curator and first director of City Museum
- Stefan Momirov (1999–), Serbian basketball player
- Dragan Mrđa, Serbian football player
- Nikola Nešković (1739–1775), Serbian painter
- Teodor Nestorović, the bishop of Vršac and leader of the Serb uprising in Banat in 1594
- Tamara Radočaj (1987–), Serbian basketball player, Olympic bronze medalist and European champion
- Jovan Sterija Popović (1806–1856), Serbian playwright, dramatist, comediographer, and pedagogue of mixed Aromanian-Serb descent
- Döme Sztójay (native name: Dimitrije Stojaković; 1883–1946), Hungarian Prime Minister and diplomat of Serb descent
- Zorana Todorović (1989–), basketball player
- Jenő Vincze (1908–1988), Hungarian international football player, most famous for playing for the Hungarian national team in the 1938 World Cup Final
- Nenad Baroš (born 1986), politician

== International relations ==
=== Consulate ===
- Romanian Consulate General, Vršac

=== Twin towns – sister cities ===
Vršac is twinned with:

- Lugoj, Romania
- Banská Bystrica, Slovakia
- Helvécia, Hungary
- Kriva Palanka, North Macedonia

== Gallery ==
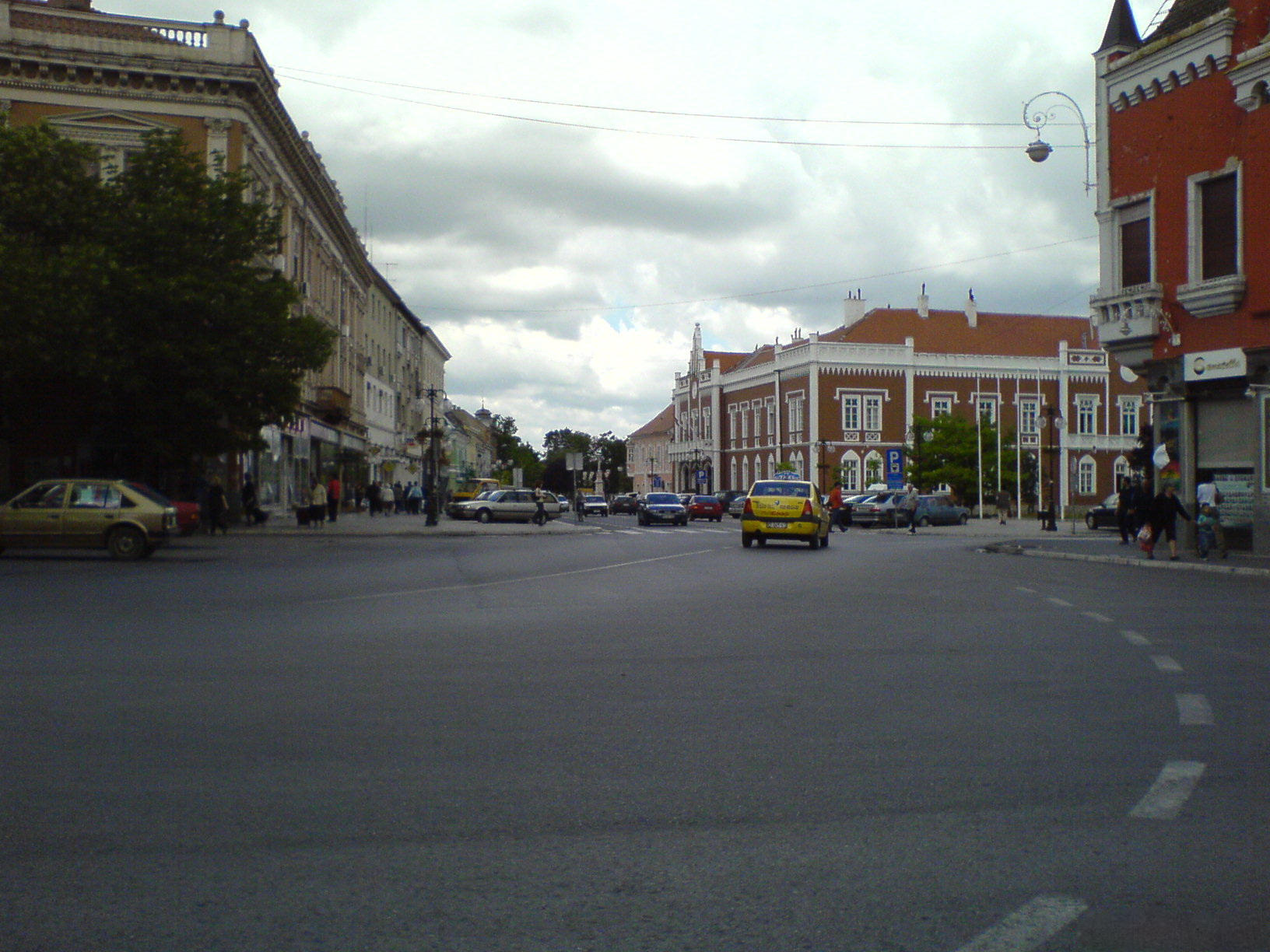
Vršac townhall

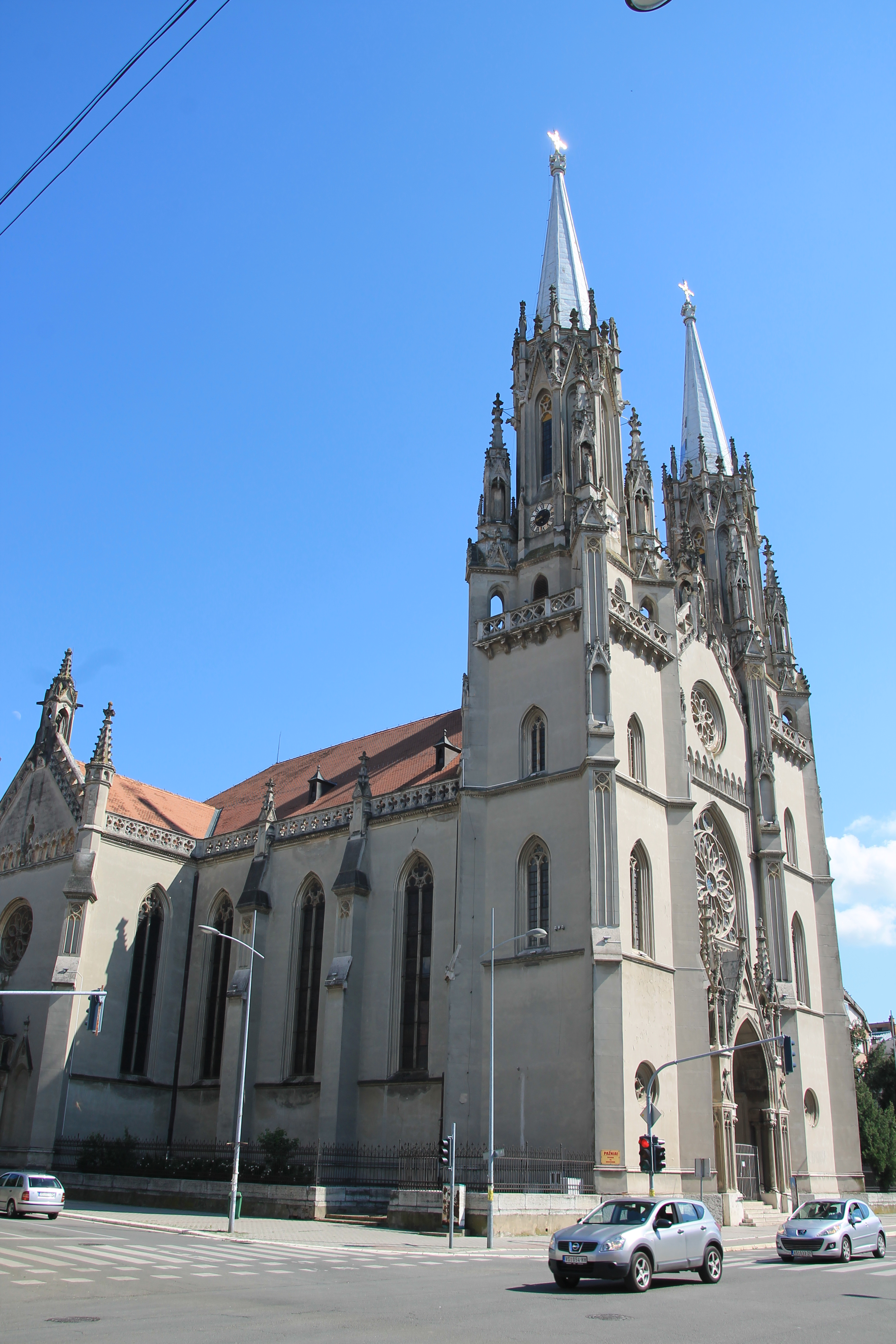
Church of Saint Gerhard de Sangredo

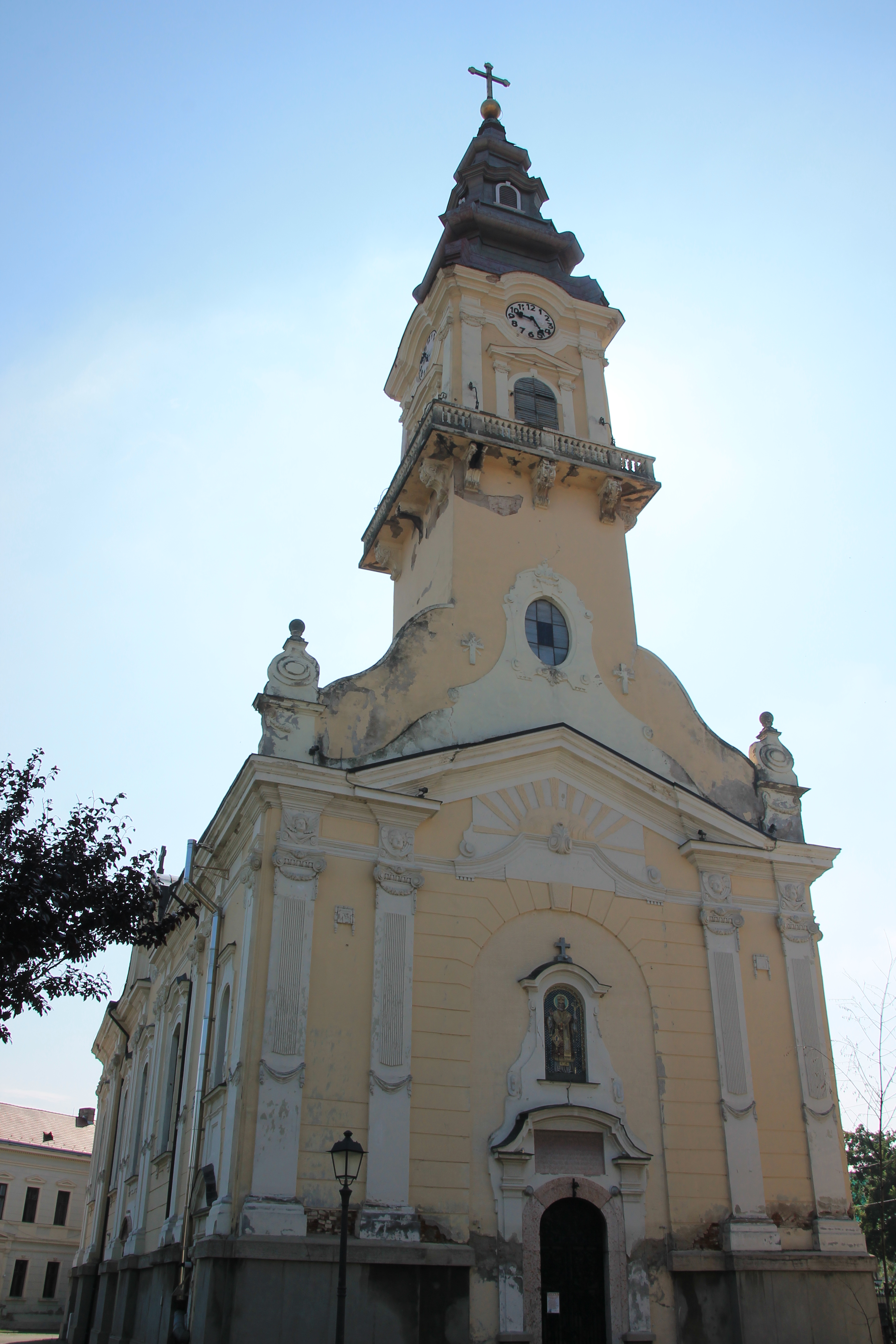
Saint Nicholas Cathedral

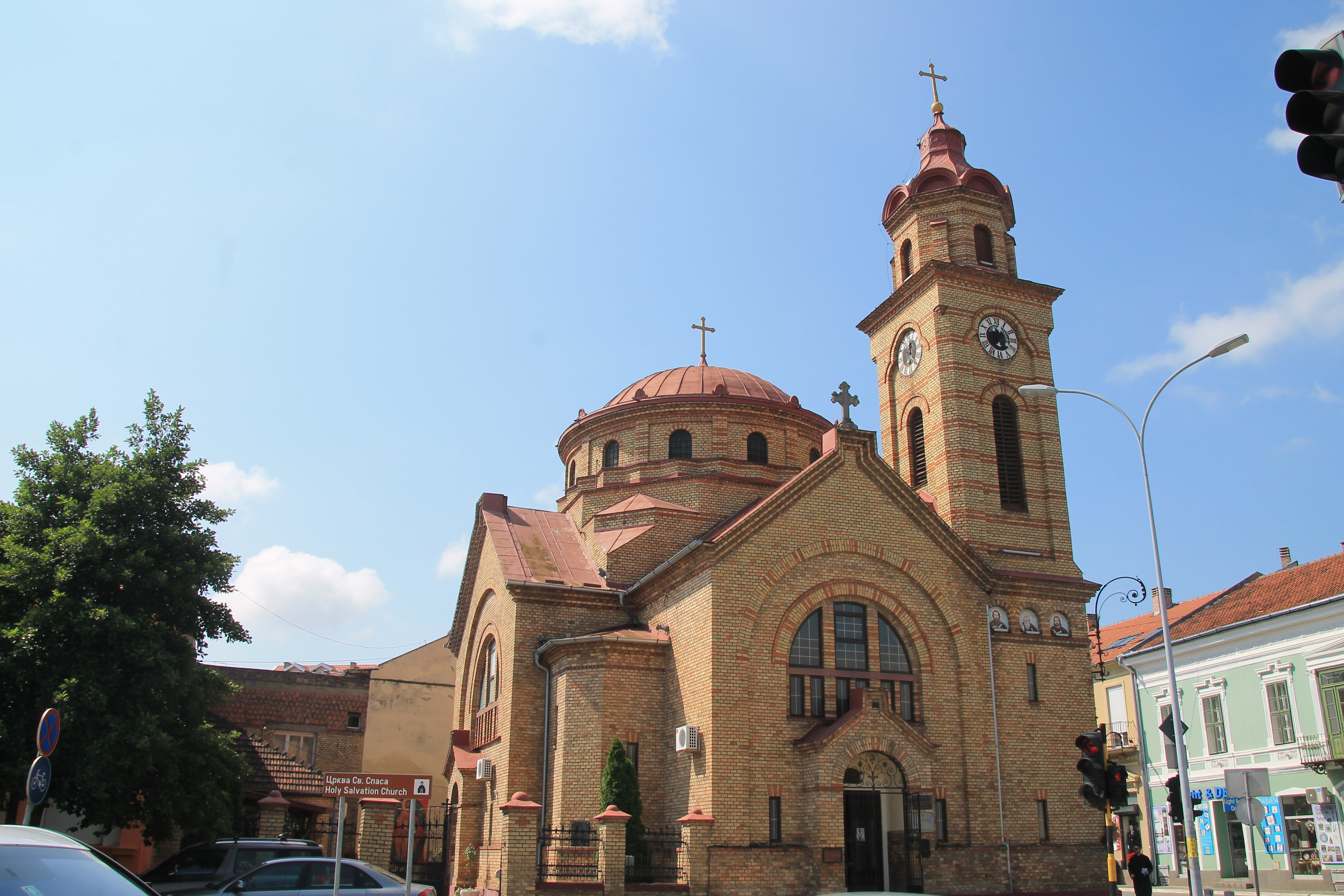
Cathedral of the Ascension of the Lord
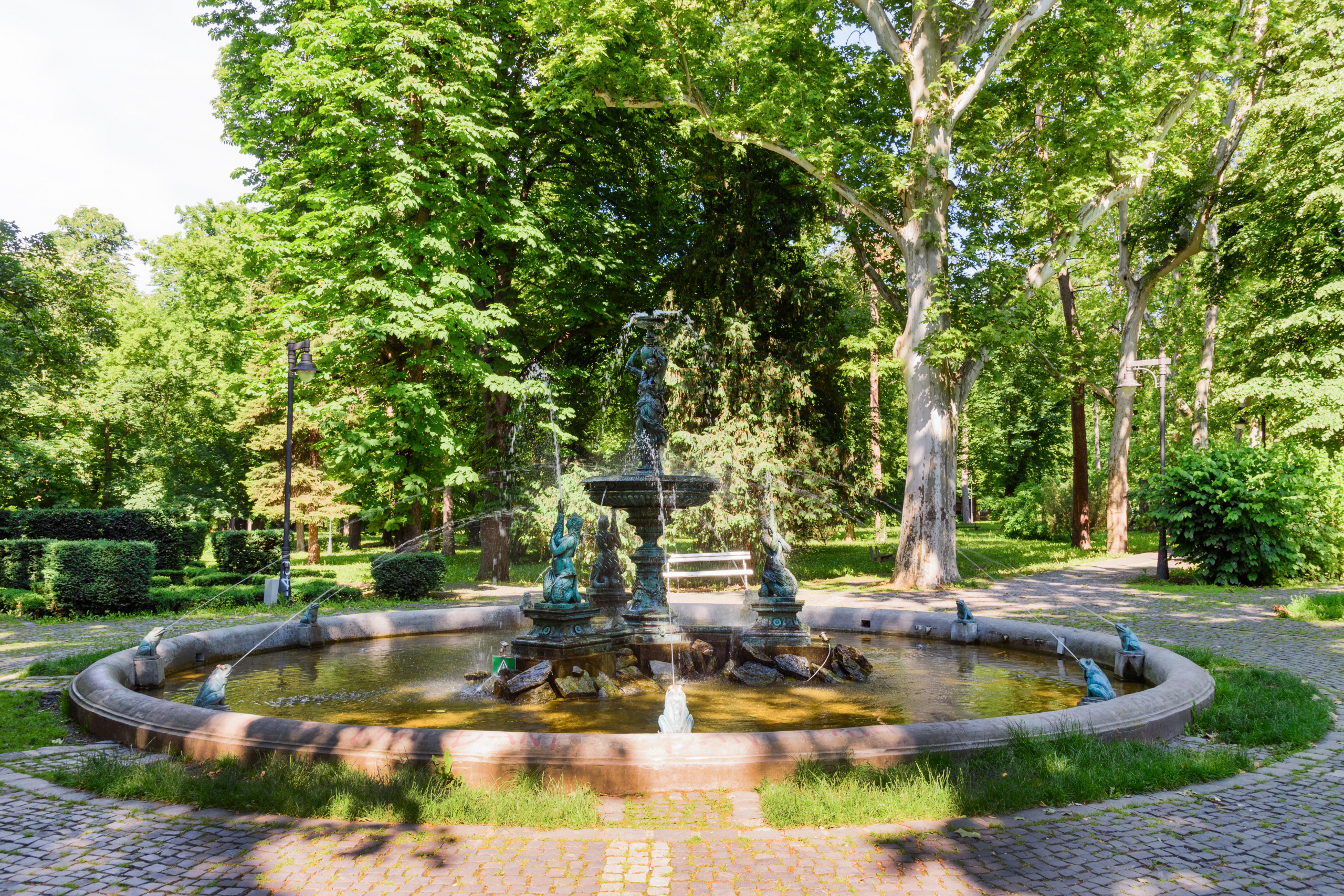
Vršac City Park

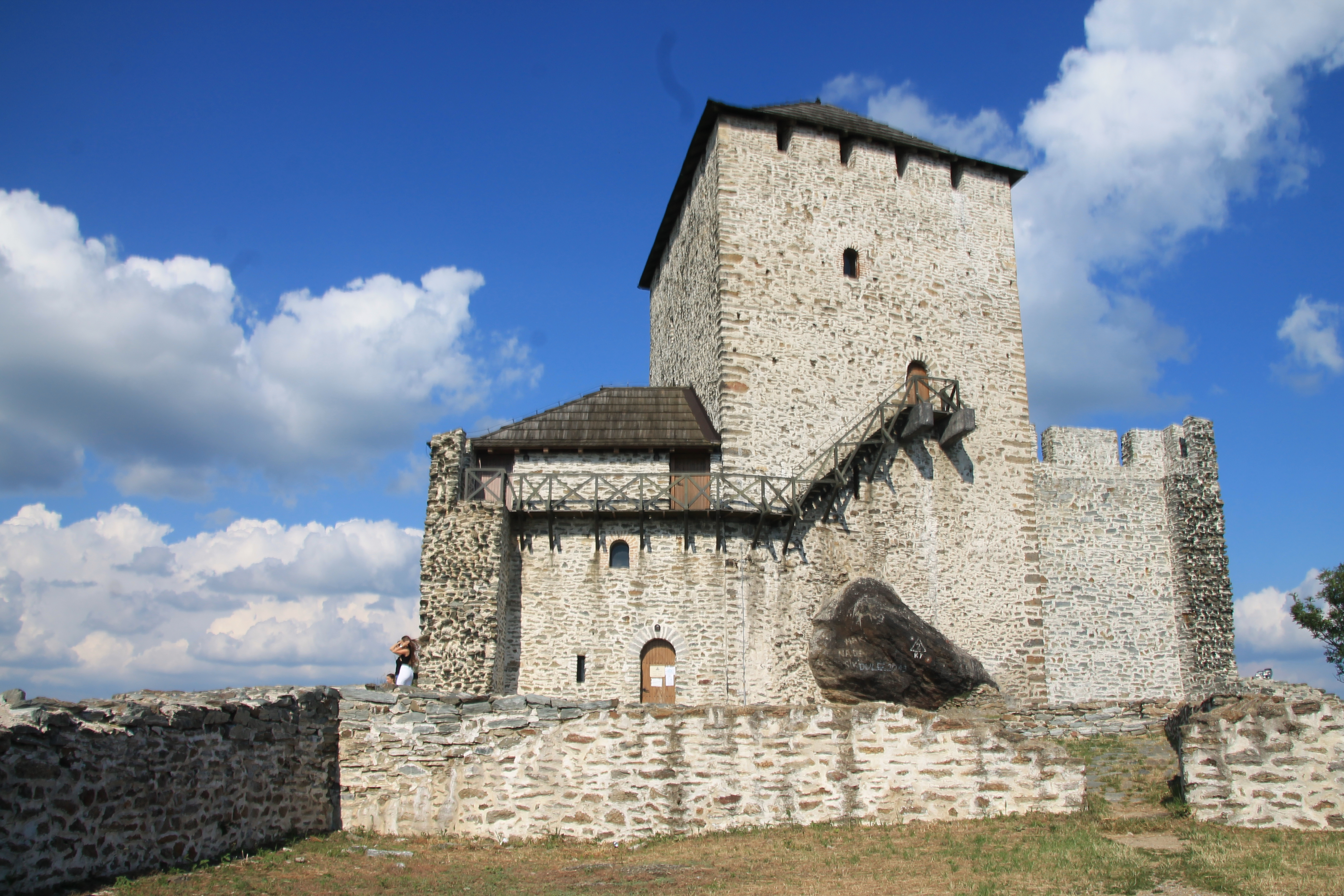
Vršac Castle

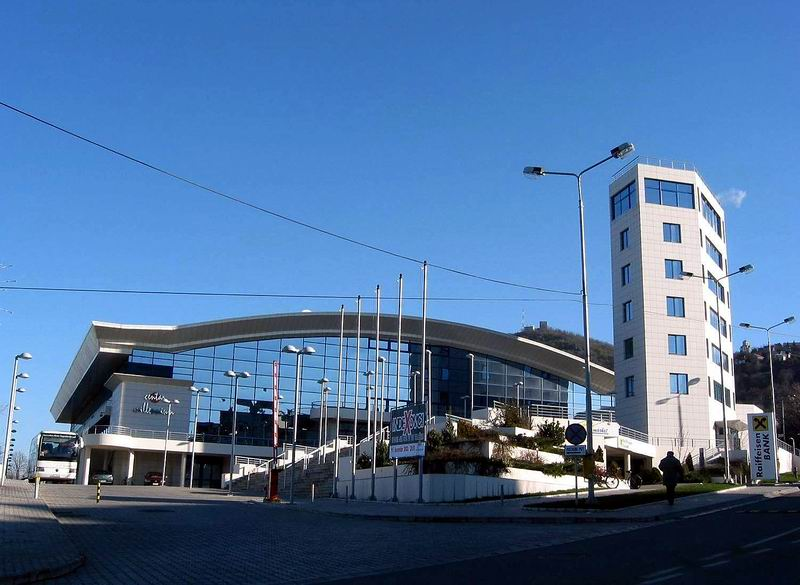
Millennium Sports Center
