= Zagajica =

Zagajica Загајица
- Village (Selo)
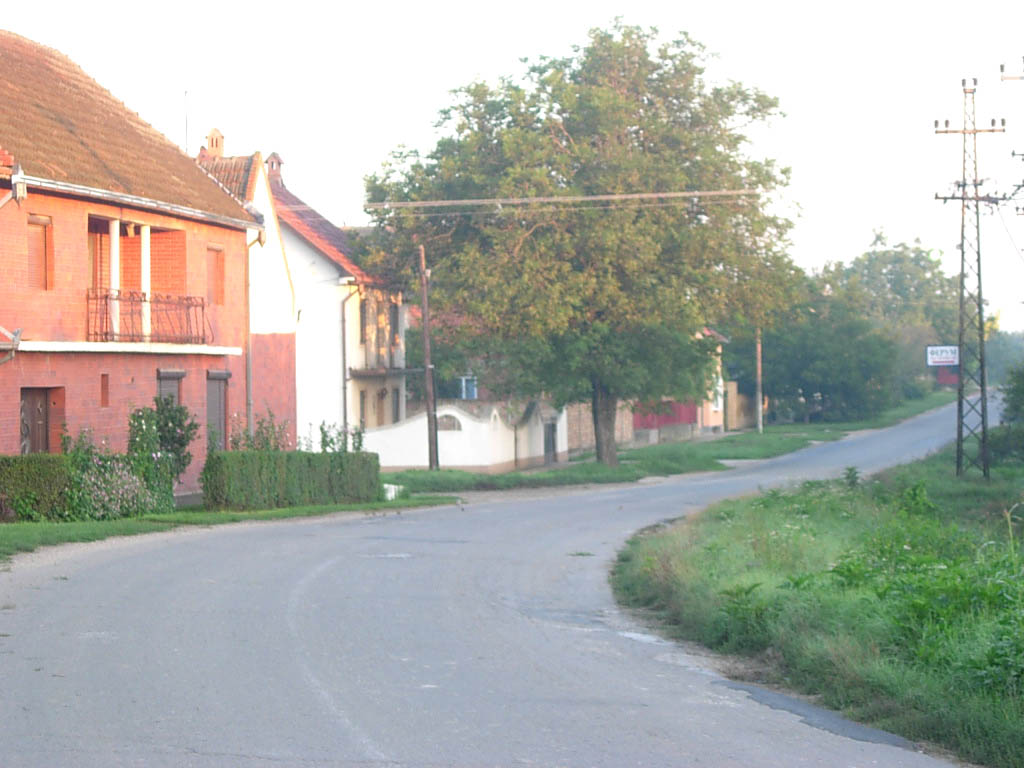
- Street detail

- Location of Zagajica within Serbia Zagajica (Serbia) Zagajica (Europe)
- Coordinates: 44°58′25″N 21°13′17″E
- Country: Serbia
- Province: Vojvodina
- District: South Banat
- Municipality: Vršac
- Elevation: 115 m (377 ft)

Population (2011)
  - Zagajica: 492
- Time zone: UTC+1 (CET)
  - Summer (DST): UTC+2 (CEST)
- Postal code: 26344
- Area code: +381(0)13
- Car plates: VŠ

Zagajica (Serbian Cyrillic: Загајица; Hungarian: Fürjes) is a village in the Vršac municipality of the South Banat District in Vojvodina province, Serbia. It is 53.4 miles from Belgrade, at the coordinates 44.97806 N 21.22444 E. At the 2011 census its population was 492, with a Serb ethnic majority of 89.21%.

== Etymology ==
In Serbian, the village is known as Zagajica (Загајица), in Hungarian as Fürjes, and in Croatian as Zagajica. The nearby Zagajička Brda (Zagajica Hills) are named for it.

== Historical population ==
- 1961: 1,214
- 1971: 1,055
- 1981: 928
- 1991: 790
- 2002: 575
- 2011: 492

== See also ==
- List of places in Serbia
- List of cities, towns and villages in Vojvodina
