= Church of St. Nicholas, Ritiševo =

Church of St. Nicholas
- Biserica ortodoxă română „Sfântul Nicolae” din Râtișor; Црква светог Николе
- Church of St. Nicholas
- 45°03′44″N 21°13′43″E
- Location: Ritiševo, Vojvodina

Cultural Heritage of Serbia
- Type: Cultural Monument of Great Importance
- Designated: 30 December 1997
- Reference no.: СК 1436
- Country: Serbia
- Denomination: Romanian Orthodox

History
- Status: Church
- Dedication: Saint Nicholas

Architecture
- Functional status: Active
- Years built: 1763

Administration
- Archdiocese: Diocese of Dacia Felix

The Church of St. Nicholas (Romanian: Biserica ortodoxă română „Sfântul Nicolae” din Râtișor, Serbian: Црква светог Николе) in Ritiševo (Râtișor) is a Romanian Orthodox church in Vojvodina, Serbia, dedicated to Saint Nicholas.

== History ==
The church was first mentioned in 1763 but was damaged during the Austro-Turkish War in 1788. It was rebuilt in 1796-97, retaining the typical form of Banat churches from the Ottoman period, with a wooden vault and a striking Baroque western façade with a small tower.

== Protection ==
The protection of the church in Ritiševo was first established by a decision of the Institute for the Protection and Scientific Study of Cultural Monuments of SAP Vojvodina in Novi Sad (No. 127) on March 5, 1958. The site's classification as a Cultural Property of Great Importance was published in the Official Gazette of AP Vojvodina No. 28/91. It was subsequently registered in the Central Register on December 30, 1997 (SK 1436) and in the Local Register on December 31, 1997 (No. 37). The Institute for the Protection of Cultural Monuments in Pančevo is responsible for maintaining the local register.

== See also ==
- Diocese of Dacia Felix
- Romanian Orthodox Cathedral, Vršac
