= Ritiševo =

Ritiševo Ритишево (Serbian) Râtișor (Romanian)
- Village (Selo)
- Location of Ritiševo within Serbia Ritiševo (Serbia) Ritiševo (Europe)
- Coordinates: 45°03′34″N 21°13′28″E
- Country: Serbia
- Province: Vojvodina
- District: South Banat
- Municipality: Vršac
- Elevation: 78 m (256 ft)

Population (2022)
  - Total: 436
- Time zone: UTC+1 (CET)
  - Summer (DST): UTC+2 (CEST)
- Area code: +381(0)13
- Car plates: VŠ

Ritiševo (Serbian Cyrillic: Ритишево; Romanian: Râtișor; Hungarian: Réthely) is a village located in the administrative area of the City of Vršac, South Banat District, Vojvodina, Serbia. The village has a population numbering 436 people (2022 census).

== Demographics ==
=== Historical population ===
- 1961: 1,098
- 1971: 1,017
- 1981: 954
- 1991: 808
- 2002: 509
- 2011: 496
- 2022: 436

=== Ethnic groups ===
According to data from the 2022 census, ethnic groups in the village include:

- 269 (61.7%) Romanians
- 64 (14.6%) Roma
- 36 (8.2%) Serbs
- Others/Undeclared/Unknown

== See also ==
- Church of St. Nicholas, Ritiševo
- List of populated places in Serbia
  - List of cities, towns and villages in Vojvodina
