= Šušara =

Šušara Шушара (Serbian) Fejértelep (Hungarian)
- Village (Selo)
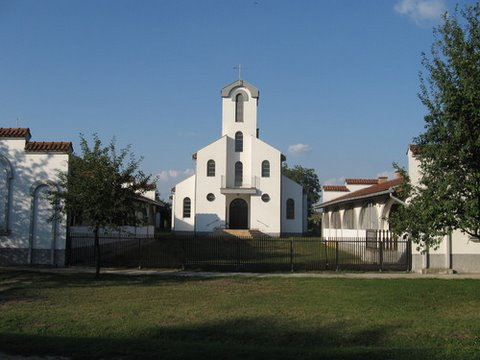
- The Roman Catholic Church

- Location of Šušara within Serbia Šušara (Serbia) Šušara (Europe)
- Coordinates: 44°56′17″N 21°07′18″E
- Country: Serbia
- Province: Vojvodina
- District: South Banat
- Municipality: Vršac
- Elevation: 169 m (554 ft)

Population (2002)
  - Šušara: 319
- Time zone: UTC+1 (CET)
  - Summer (DST): UTC+2 (CEST)
- Area code: +381(0)13
- Car plates: VŠ

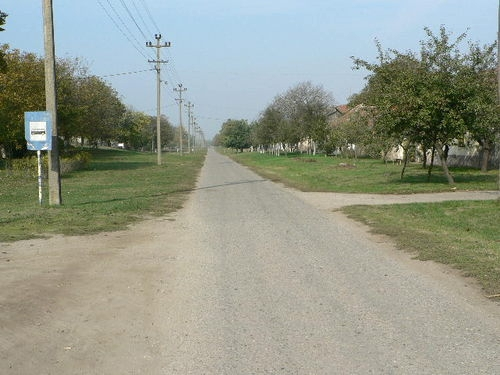
Susara Street detail.

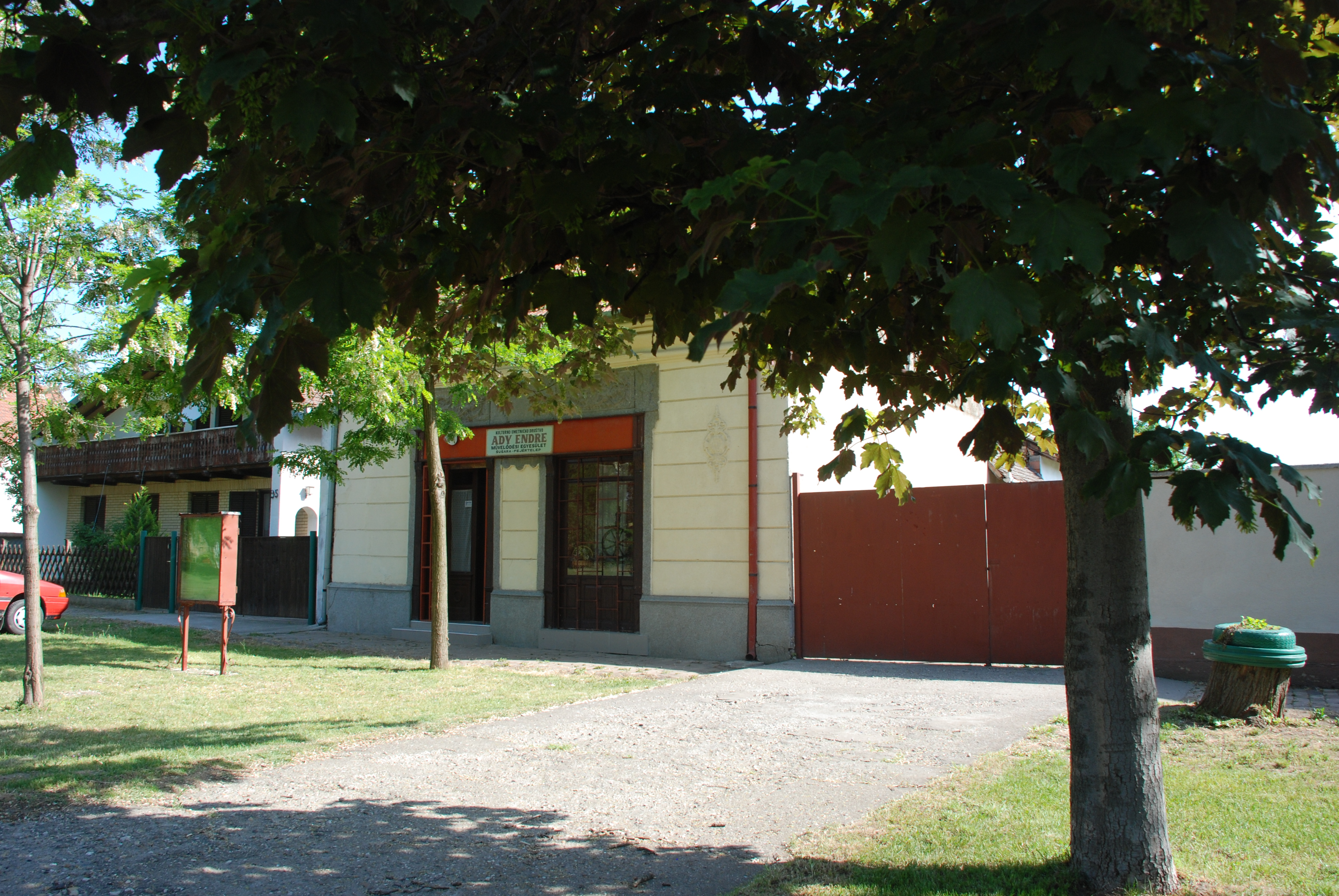
House of the local Traditional Folkways Care Association

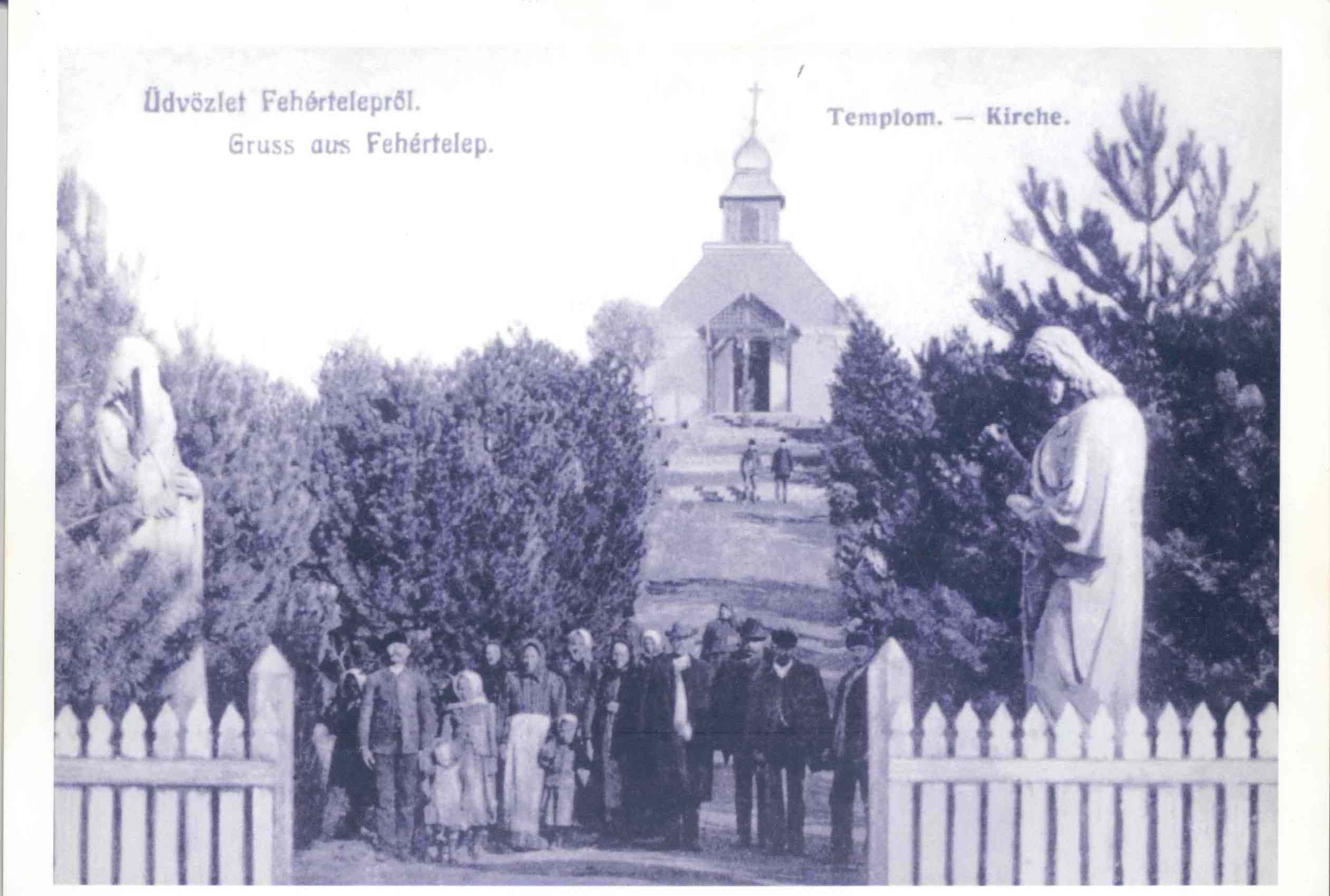
Postcard of Šušara (Fejértelep) from 1902.

Šušara (Serbian Cyrillic: Шушара; Hungarian: Fejértelep; German: Schuschara) is a village in Serbia. It is situated in the Vršac municipality, in the South Banat District, Vojvodina province. The village has a Hungarian ethnic majority (64.09%) and its population numbering 319 people (2002 census).

== Population ==
In the settlement Susara's 296 adult inhabitants, the average age of the population is 40.9 years (39.3 for men and 42.5 for women). The village has 139 households, the average number of members per household is 2.71. The population in this village is very inhomogeneous and the last three censuses registered a decline in the population.

- 1894: 1044
- 1910: 946
- 1921: 1016
- 1948: 748
- 1953: 851
- 1961: 819
- 1971: 648
- 1981: 496
- 1991: 472
- 2002: 416
- 2011: 319

== Gallery ==
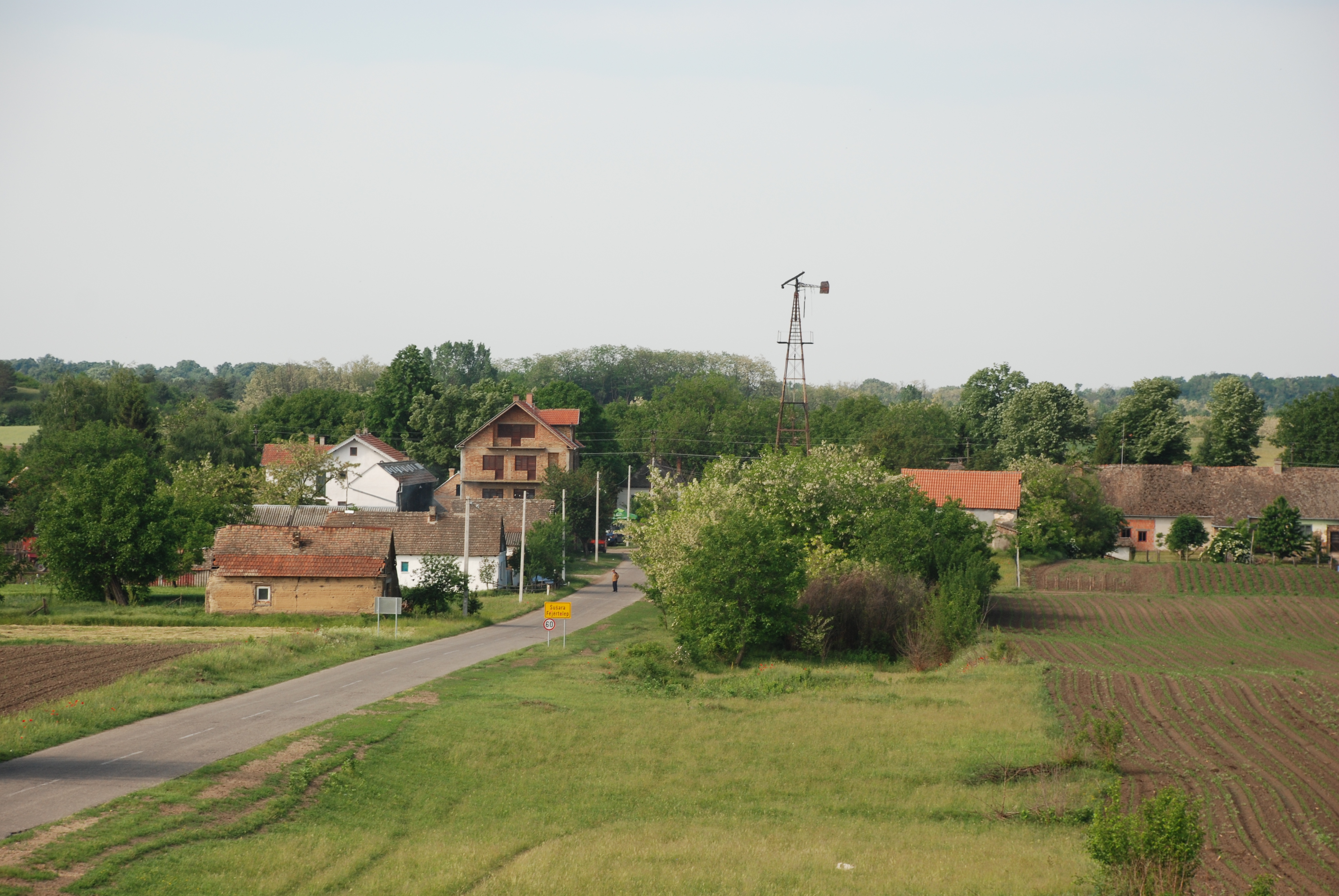
Šušara

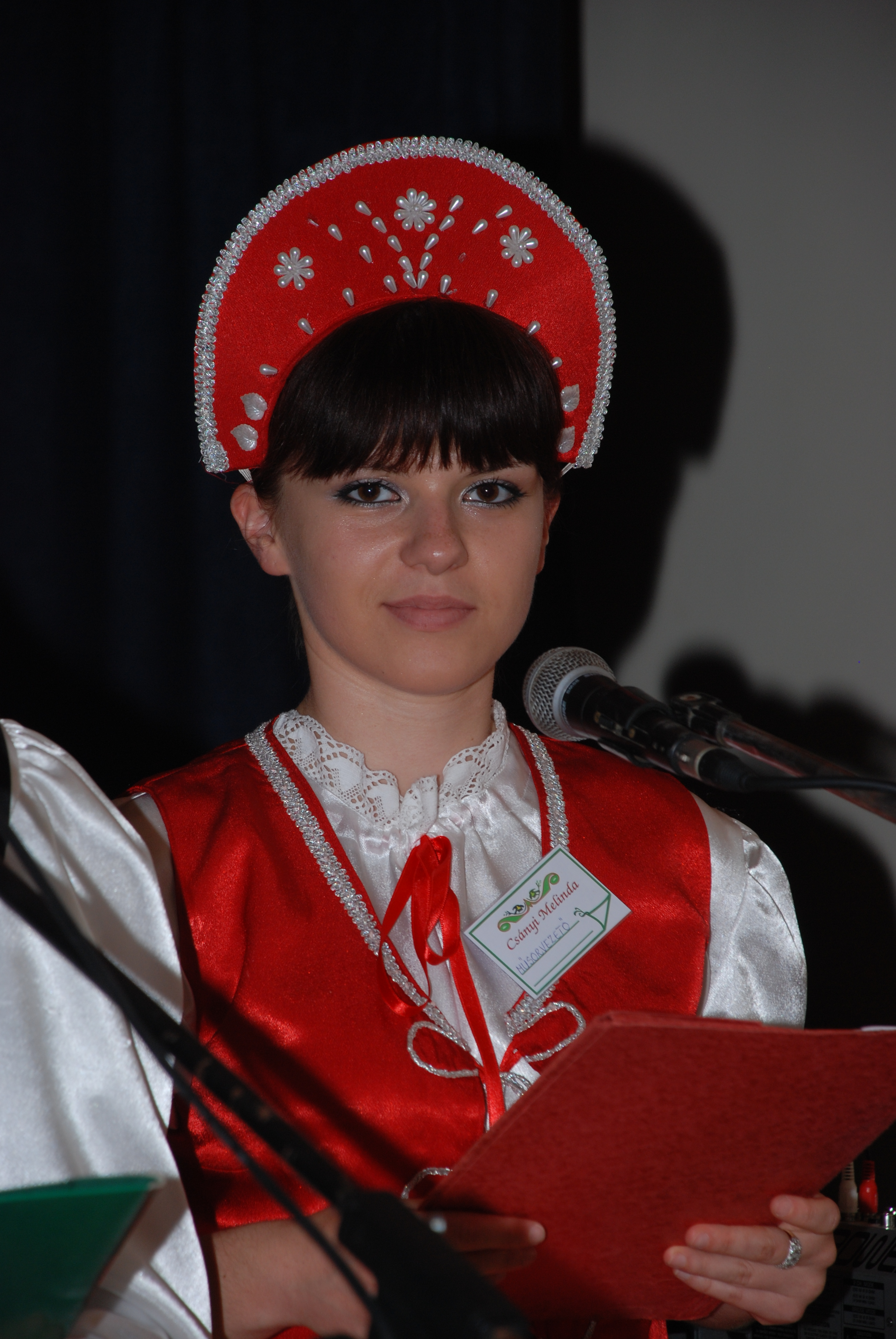

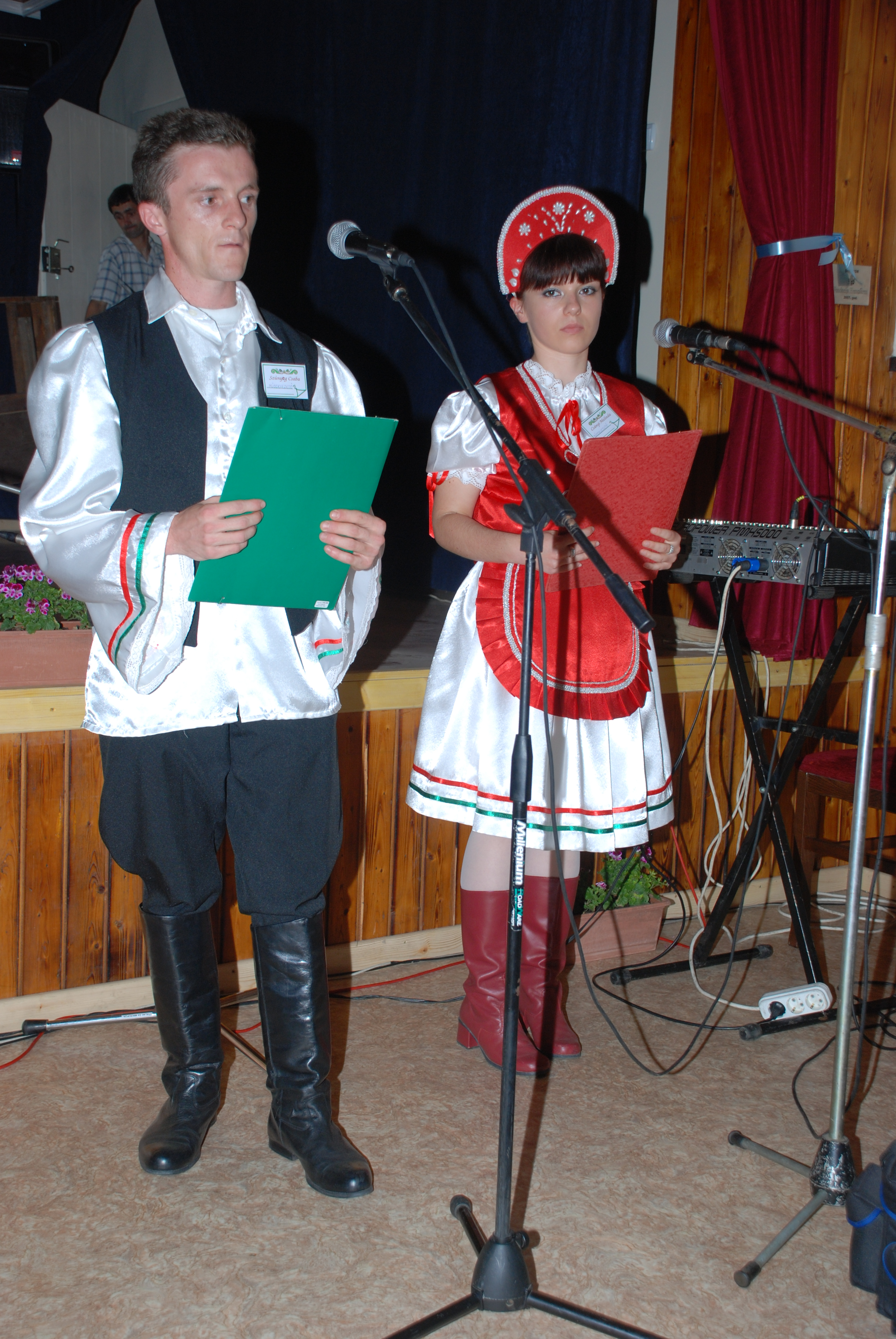

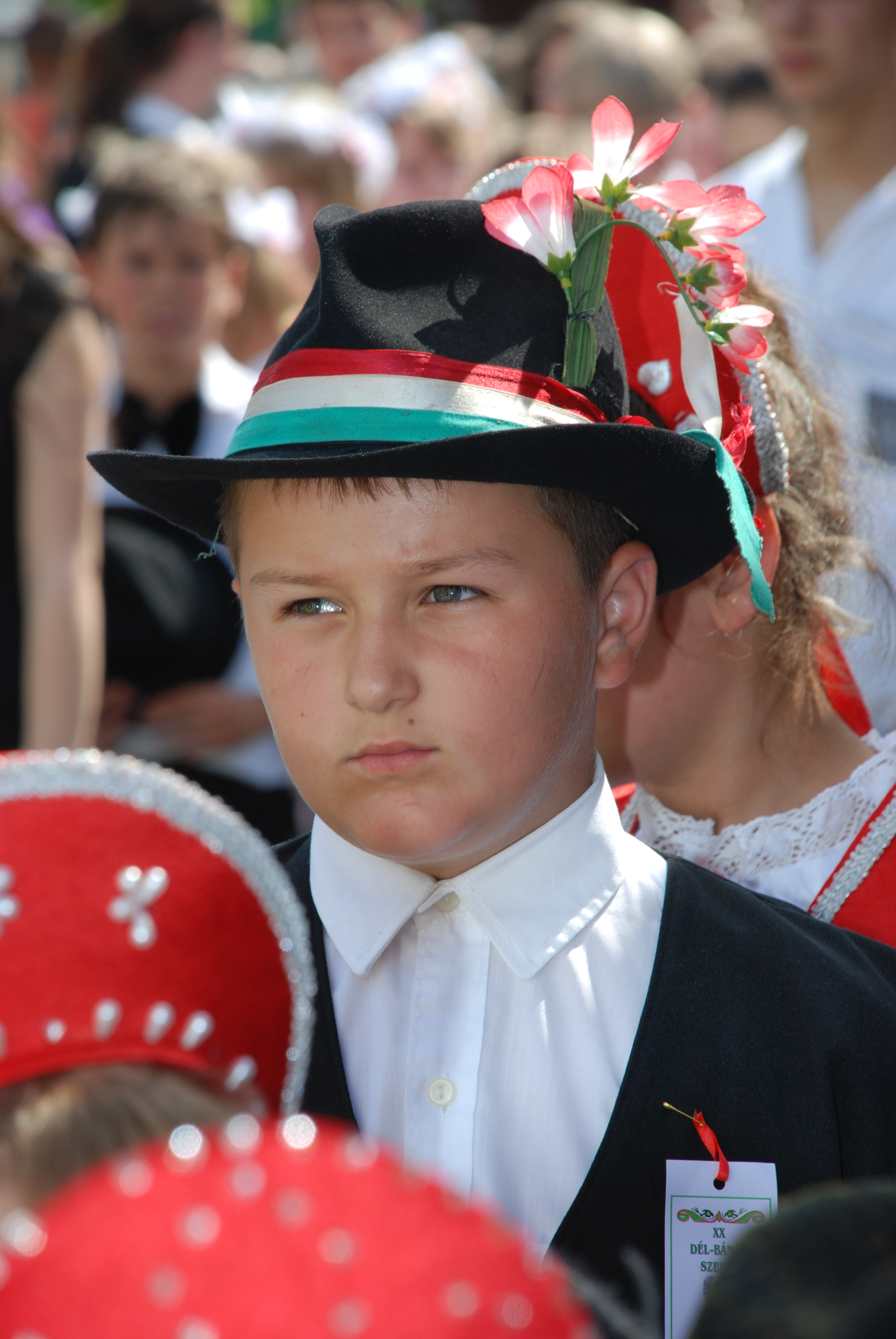

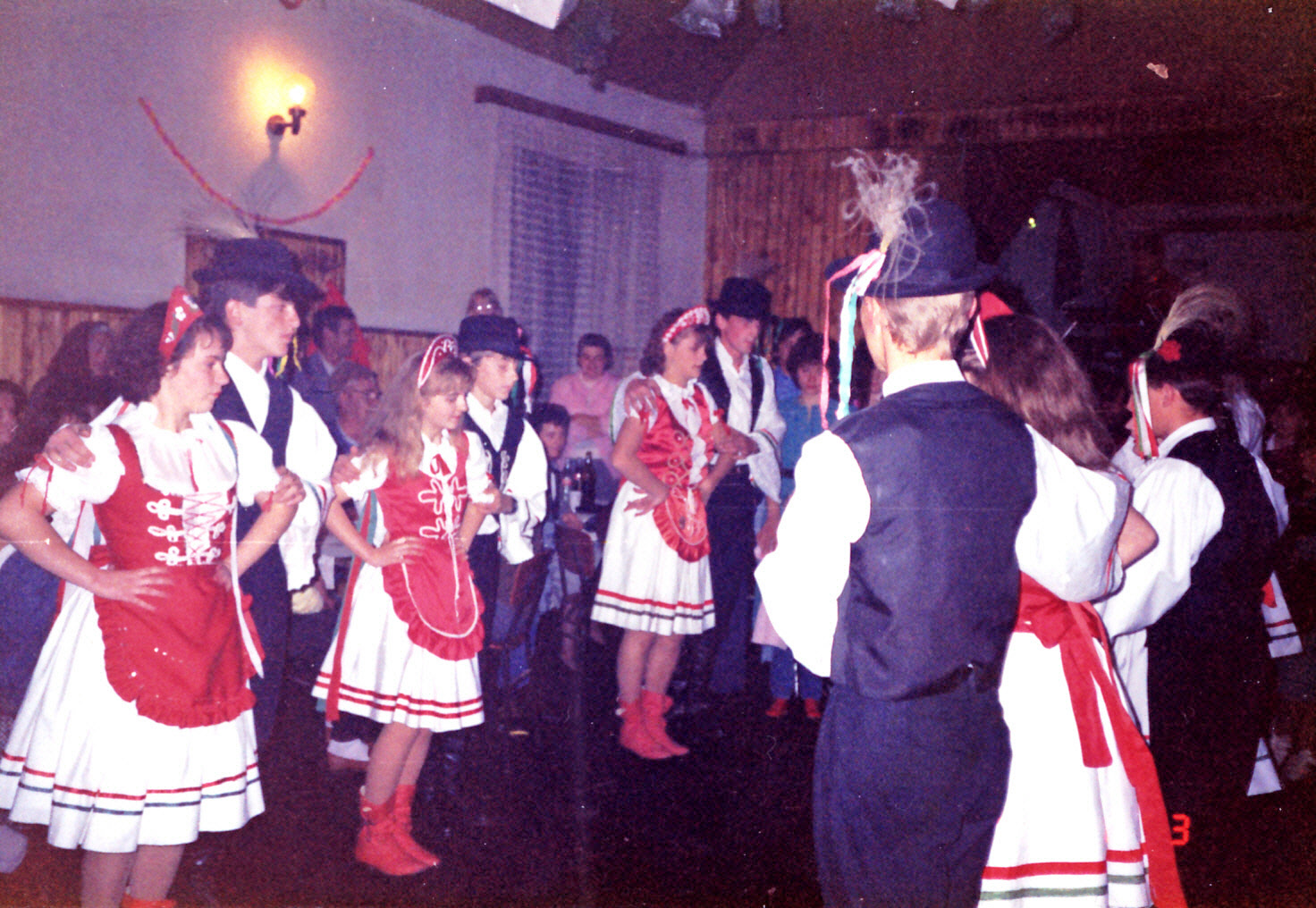

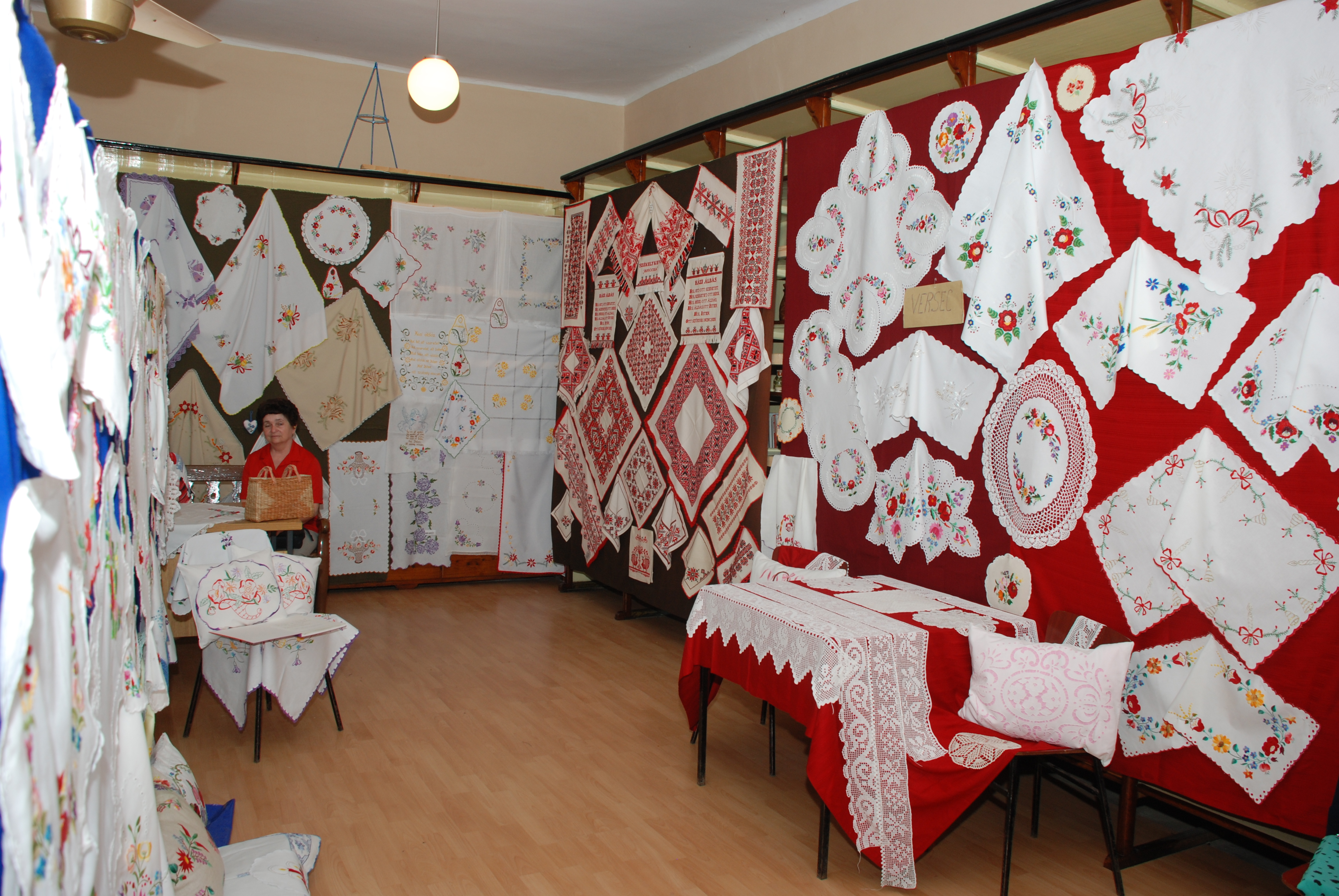

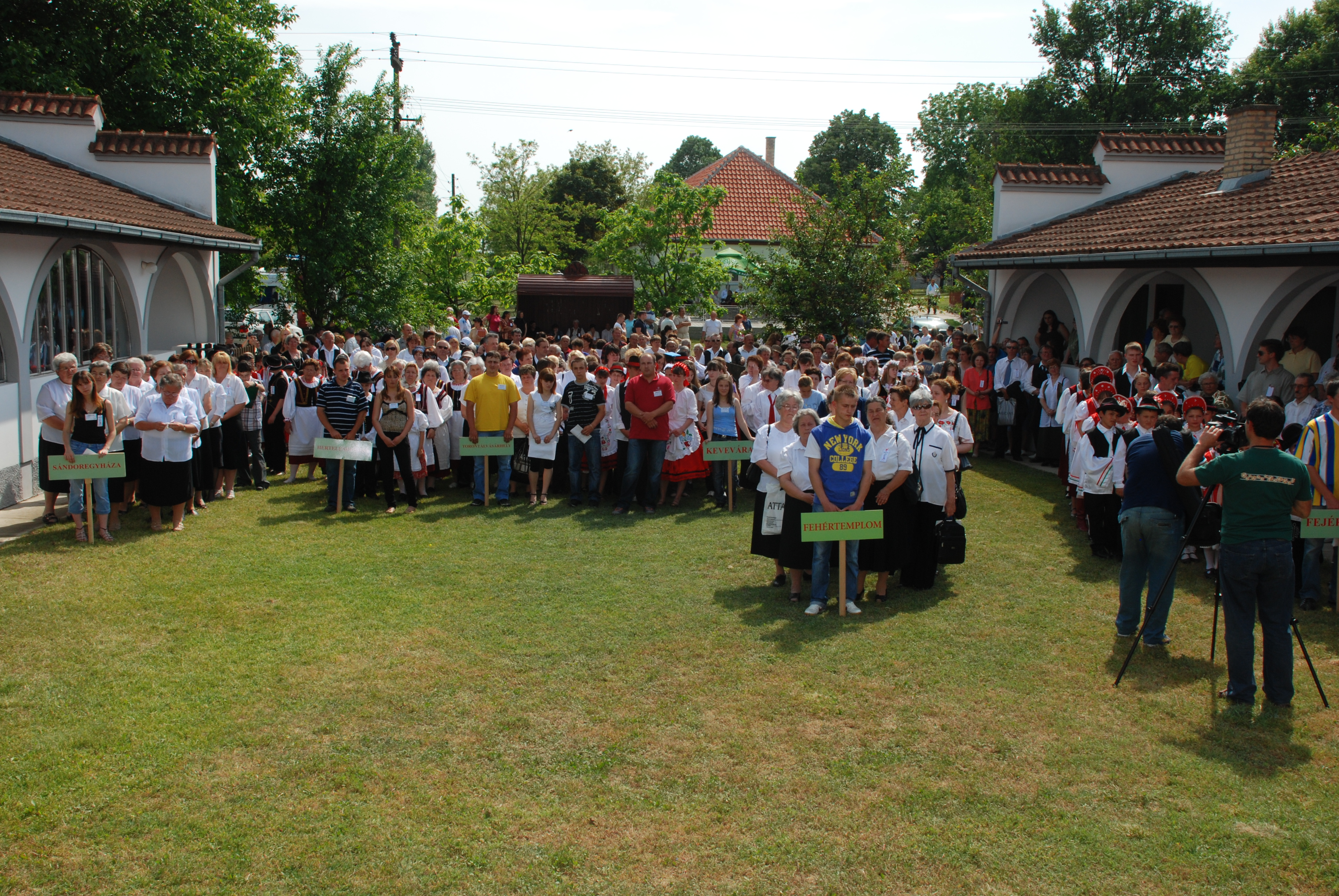

== See also ==
- List of places in Serbia
- List of cities, towns and villages in Vojvodina
