= Sočica =

Sočica Сочица (Serbian) Sălcița (Romanian)
- Village (Selo)
- Location of Sočica within Serbia Sočica (Serbia) Sočica (Europe)
- Coordinates: 45°05′13″N 21°26′32″E
- Country: Serbia
- Province: Vojvodina
- District: South Banat
- Municipality: Vršac
- Elevation: 154 m (505 ft)

Population (2022)
  - Total: 112
- Time zone: UTC+1 (CET)
  - Summer (DST): UTC+2 (CEST)
- Area code: +381(0)13
- Car plates: VŠ

Sočica (Serbian Cyrillic: Сочица; Romanian: Sălcița; Hungarian: Temesszőlős) is a village located in the administrative area of the City of Vršac, South Banat District, Vojvodina, Serbia. The village has a population of 112 people (2022 census).

== Demographics ==
=== Historical population ===
- 1961: 595
- 1971: 470
- 1981: 340
- 1991: 291
- 2002: 170
- 2022: 112

=== Ethnic groups ===
According to data from the 2022 census, ethnic groups in the village include:

- 98 (87.5%) Romanians
- 8 (7.1%) Serbs
- Others/Undeclared/Unknown

== See also ==
- List of places in Serbia
- List of cities, towns and villages in Vojvodina
