= Jablanka =

Jablanka Јабланка (Serbian) Iablanca (Romanian)
- Village (Selo)
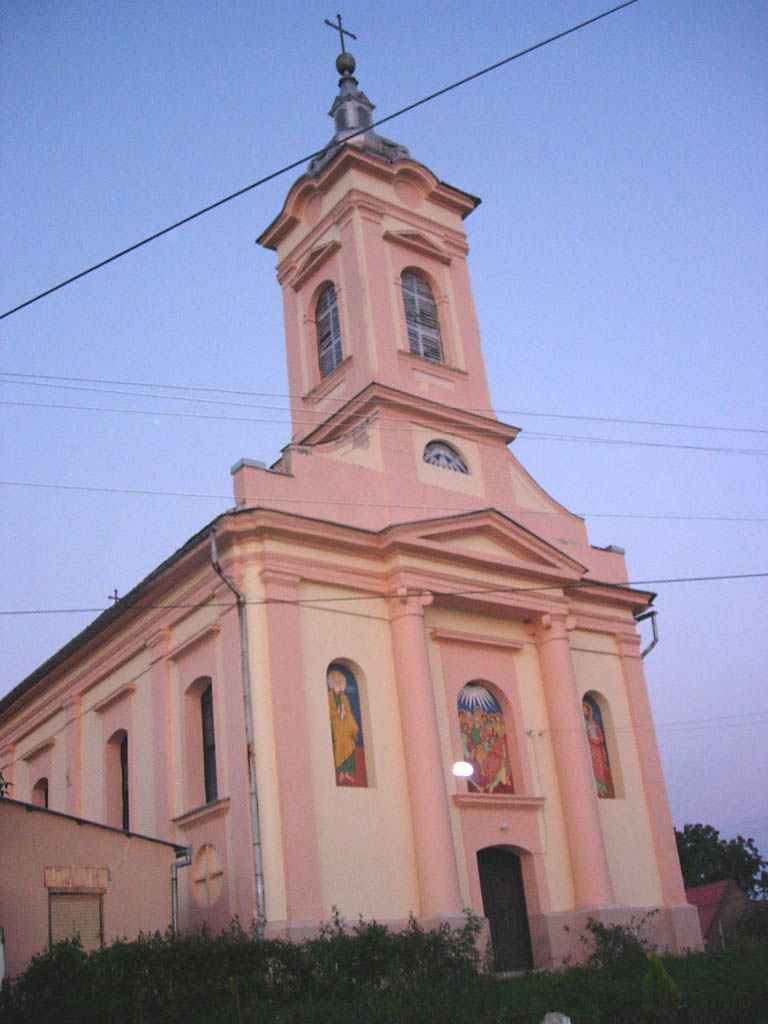
- The Romanian Orthodox Church

- Location of Jablanka within Serbia Jablanka (Serbia) Jablanka (Europe)
- Coordinates: 45°04′25″N 21°23′19″E
- Country: Serbia
- Province: Vojvodina
- District: South Banat
- Municipality: Vršac
- Elevation: 153 m (502 ft)

Population (2022)
  - Total: 223
- Time zone: UTC+1 (CET)
  - Summer (DST): UTC+2 (CEST)
- Area code: +381(0)13
- Car plates: VŠ

Jablanka (Serbian Cyrillic: Јабланка; Romanian: Iablanca; Hungarian: Almád) is a village located in the administrative area of the City of Vršac, South Banat District, Vojvodina, Serbia. The village has a population of 223 people (2022 census)..

== Demographics ==
=== Historical population ===
- 1961: 760
- 1971: 633
- 1981: 536
- 1991: 459
- 2002: 281
- 2022: 223

=== Ethnic groups ===
According to data from the 2022 census, ethnic groups in the village include:

- 120 (53.8%) Romanians
- 61 (27.3%) Serbs
- Others/Undeclared/Unknown
