= Vršački Ritovi =

Vršački Ritovi Вршачки Ритови (Serbian) Verseci Rétek (Hungarian)
- Village (Selo)
- Location of Vršački Ritovi within Serbia Vršački Ritovi (Serbia) Vršački Ritovi (Europe)
- Coordinates: 45°09′23″N 21°10′11″E
- Country: Serbia
- Province: Vojvodina
- District: South Banat
- Municipality: Vršac
- Elevation: 76 m (249 ft)

Population (2022)
  - Vršački Ritovi: 19
- Time zone: UTC+1 (CET)
  - Summer (DST): UTC+2 (CEST)
- Area code: +381(0)13
- Car plates: VŠ

Vršački Ritovi (Serbian Cyrillic: Вршачки Ритови; Hungarian: Verseci Rétek) is a village located in Serbia at 45° 9' 38" North, 21° 10' 19" East. It is situated in the Vršac municipality, in Banat region (South Banat District), Vojvodina province.

== Name ==
In Serbian, the village is known as Вршачки Ритови or Vršački Ritovi, in Hungarian as Verseci Rétek, and in Croatian as Vršački Ritovi.

The name of village means "Marshes of Vršac", because the village is situated on the site of former marshes.

== History ==
The village is pretty new, and was built around the former large agricultural corporation "Vršački Ritovi", once the driving economic force of the region. The place was populated before that, yet with just a few houses. Beginning from 1950s, the village started to grow, and reached its peak in the mid-1970s and 1980s, with its small but pretty rich population. The break-up of Yugoslavia brought decline of village. Leaned mostly on agricultural corporation in which majority of inhabitants were employed, village started its rapid decline. Imposed UN embargo on Yugoslavia brought halt to export of agricultural products, while breakup of USSR, its major market, brought total collapse. Corporation was state-owned, and started to break up itself into small companies, out of whom only fish farm remained in work.

== Geography ==
Being officially classified as a single village, Vršački Ritovi is actually composed of two separate inhabited places: proper Vršački Ritovi, which is situated near the railroad that connects Vršac and Zrenjanin and is some 3 km far from regional road, and Novogradnja (Serbian: Новоградња).

Proper Vršački Ritovi is commonly named by inhabitants as Pumpa (Serbian: Пумпа) - "The Pump", because on that place in the past was water pump.

Novogradnja got its name for Serbian word for newly built place, and is situated on the regional Vršac-Zrenjanin road, near the administrative building of former corporation and wheat silo. Smaller than Pumpa, Novogradnja is actually main part of Vršački Ritovi and is still actively inhabited place.

== Demography ==
The village has a Serb ethnic majority (65.93%) with a seizable Hungarian (15.38%) and Rroma people (7.69%). Its total population numbering 37 inhabitants (2011 census).

== Historical population ==
- 1961: 636
- 1971: 424
- 1981: 224
- 1991: 156
- 2002: 91
- 2011: 37
- 2022: 19

== See also ==
- Ćurčić, Slobodan (1996). Broj stanovnika Vojvodine (in Serbian). Novi Sad: Matica srpska, Odeljenje za društvene nauke.
- List of places in Serbia
- List of cities, towns and villages in Vojvodina
