= Potporanj =

Potporanj Потпорањ
- Village (Selo)
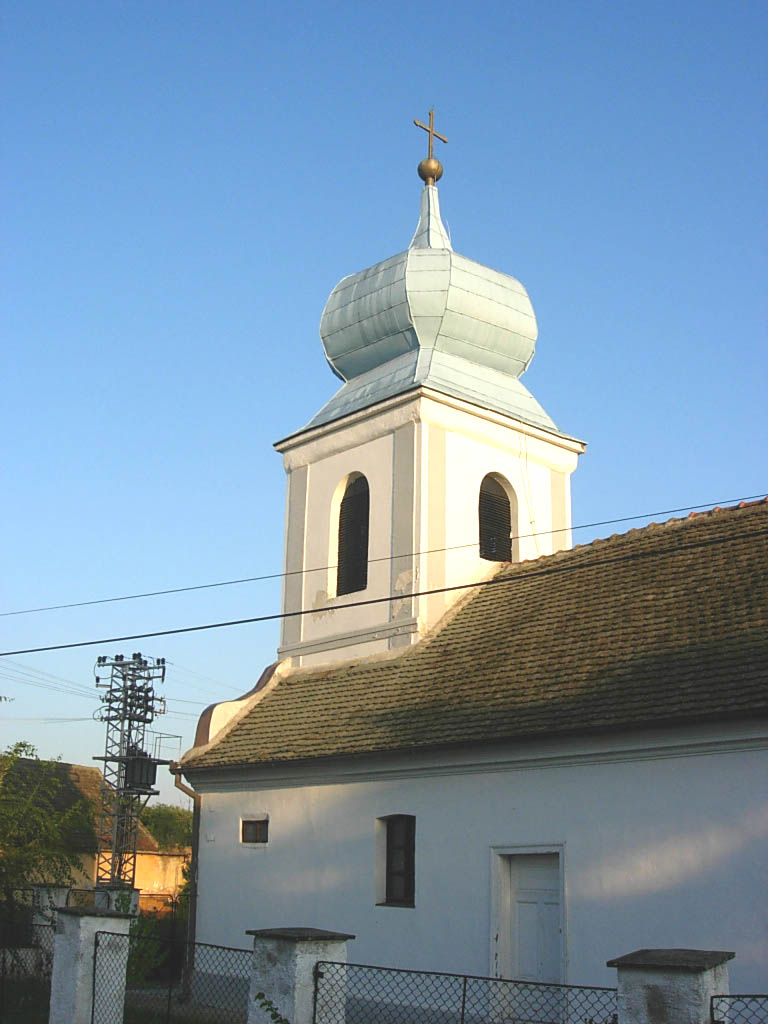
- The Orthodox Church

- Location of Potporanj within Serbia Potporanj (Serbia) Potporanj (Europe)
- Coordinates: 45°01′19″N 21°14′32″E
- Country: Serbia
- Province: Vojvodina
- District: South Banat
- Municipality: Vršac
- Elevation: 84 m (276 ft)

Population (2002)
  - Potporanj: 273
- Time zone: UTC+1 (CET)
  - Summer (DST): UTC+2 (CEST)
- Area code: +381(0)13
- Car plates: VŠ

Potporanj (Serbian Cyrillic: Потпорањ; Hungarian: Porány) is a village in Serbia. It is situated in the Vršac municipality, in the South Banat District, Vojvodina province. The village has a Serb ethnic majority (94.21%) and its population numbering 273 people (2002 census).

== Sources ==
- Letopis Opština u južnom Banatu: Banatska mesta i običaji, Marina M.(Beč 1999)
- Mileker, Feliks, 2005: Milekerovi letopisi Opština u južnom Banatu ISBN 8685075041
