= Orešac (Vršac) =

Orešac Орешац (Serbian) Oreșaț (Romanian)
- Village (Selo)
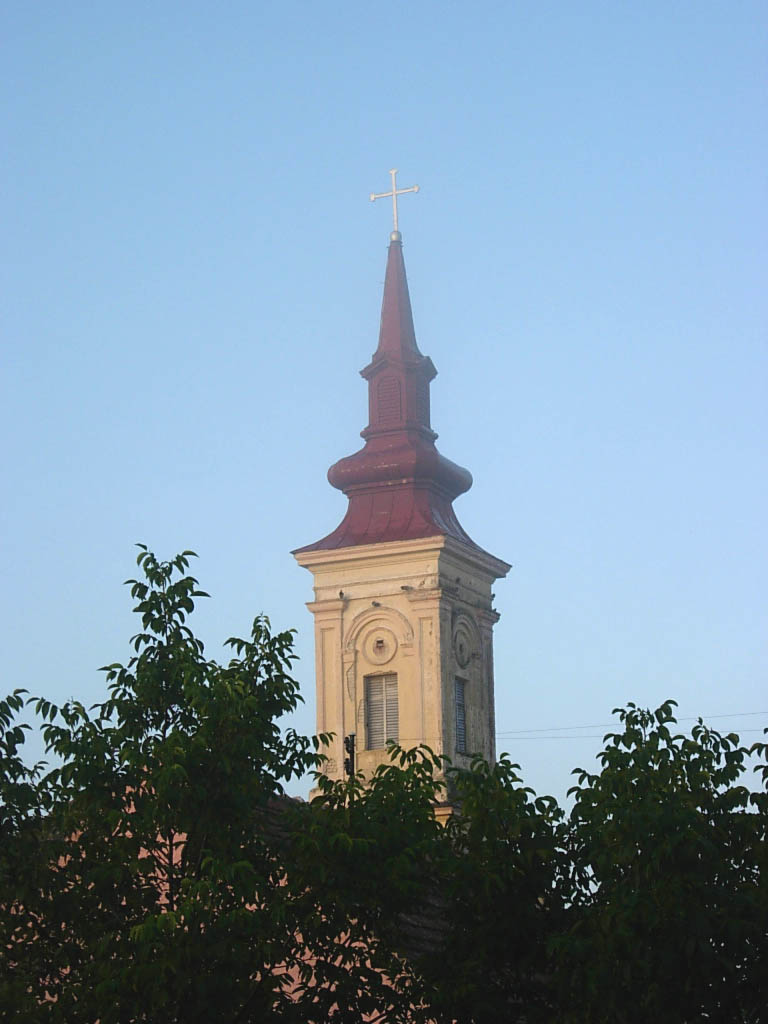
- The Romanian Orthodox Church

- Location of Orešac within Serbia Orešac (Serbia) Orešac (Europe)
- Coordinates: 44°57′17″N 21°16′13″E
- Country: Serbia
- Province: Vojvodina
- District: South Banat
- Municipality: Vršac
- Elevation: 73 m (240 ft)

Population (2022)
  - Total: 280
- Time zone: UTC+1 (CET)
  - Summer (DST): UTC+2 (CEST)
- Area code: +381(0)13
- Car plates: VŠ

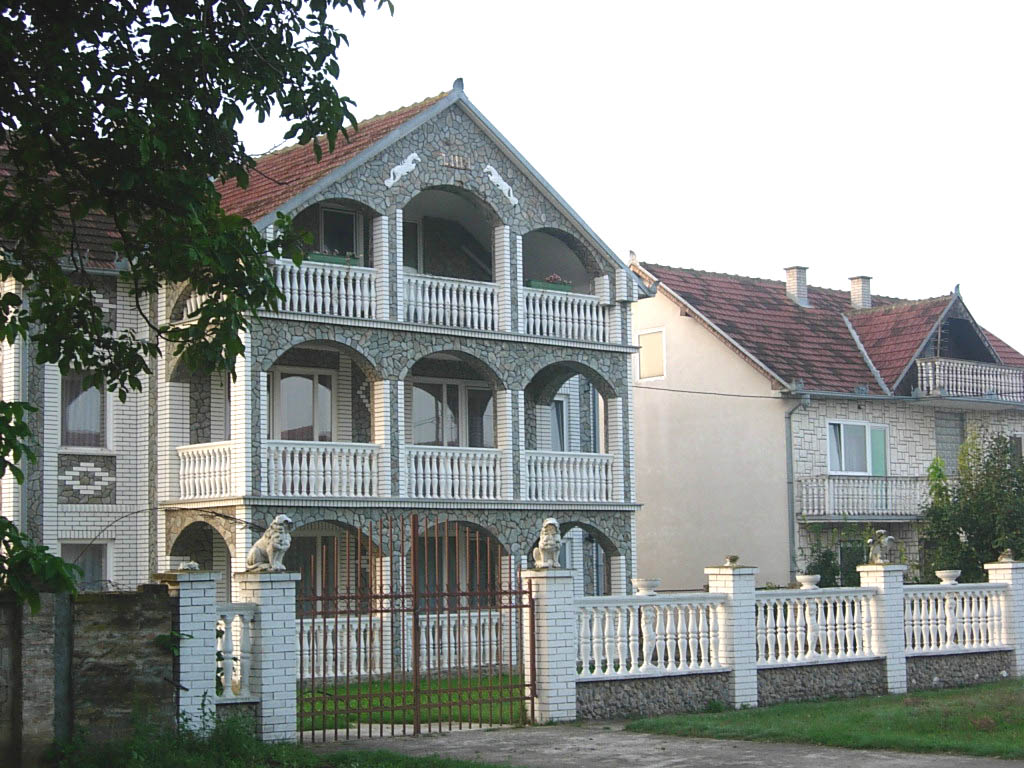
Mediterranean palace in a little Pannonian village.

Orešac (Serbian Cyrillic: Орешац; Romanian: Oreșaț; Hungarian: Homokdiód) is a village located in the administrative area of the City of Vršac, South Banat District, Vojvodina, Serbia. The village has a population of 280 people (2022 census).

== Demographics ==
=== Historical population ===
- 1961: 813
- 1971: 738
- 1981: 647
- 1991: 570
- 2002: 420
- 2022: 280

=== Ethnic groups ===
According to data from the 2022 census, ethnic groups in the village include:

- 133 (47.5%) Serbs
- 86 (30.7%) Romanians
- 40 (14.3%) Roma
- Others/Undeclared/Unknown

== See also ==
- List of places in Serbia
- List of cities, towns and villages in Vojvodina
