= Pavlish =

Pavlish (Ukrainian: Павліш) is a Ukrainian-language surname. Notable people with the surname include:

- Dmytriy Pavlish (born 1999), Ukrainian footballer
- Pavlo Pavlish (born 1979), Ukrainian politician

== See also ==
- Pavlysh (surname)
- Pavliš
