= Pavlysh (surname) =

Pavlysh is a surname. Notable people with the surname include:

- Doctor Pavlysh, a fictional character in science fiction works of Russian writer Kir Bulychev
- Vita Pavlysh, Ukrainian track and field athlete

== See also ==
- Pavlish
- Pavliš
