= Half a Life =

Half a Life may refer to:

- Half a Life (Bulychev), a 1973 novel by Kir Bulychev
- Half a Life (short story collection), a 1977 collection of translations of science fiction stories by Kir Bulychev
- Half a Life (film), a 1982 film by Romain Goupil
- Half a Life (novel), a 2001 novel by V.S. Naipaul
- Half a Life (memoir), a 2011 memoir by Darin Strauss
- "Half a Life", Medical Center season 6, episode 23 (1975)
- "Half a Life", Star Trek: The Next Generation season 4, episode 22 (1991)

== See also ==
- Half-life (disambiguation)
