= Žarko Zrenjanin =

Yugoslav partisan (1902-1942)

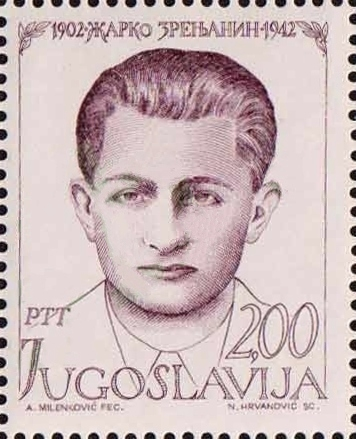
- Born: Žarko Zrenjanin; 11 September 1902; Izbistye, Hungary (now Izbište, Serbia)
- Died: 4 November 1942 (aged 40); Pavliš, Territory of the Military Commander in Serbia
- Military career
- Allegiance: Yugoslav Partisans
- Service years: 1941–1942
- Nickname: Uča
- Awards: People's Hero of Yugoslavia

Žarko Zrenjanin "Uča" (Serbian Cyrillic: Жарко Зрењанин, pronounced [ʒǎːrkɔ zrɛ̌ɲanin ǔːt͡ʃa]; 11 September 1902 – 4 November 1942) was a Yugoslav partisan and National Hero of Yugoslavia. The city of Zrenjanin, in Serbia, is named after him, since 1946.

Zrenjanin was born in Izbistye, Kingdom of Hungary (today Izbište, Serbia). He became a leader of the Vojvodina Communists and when World War II began, the Partisans. Zrenjanin endured torture and months of incarceration by the Nazis during the Second World War. He was released and later killed in Pavliš while trying to escape recapture.

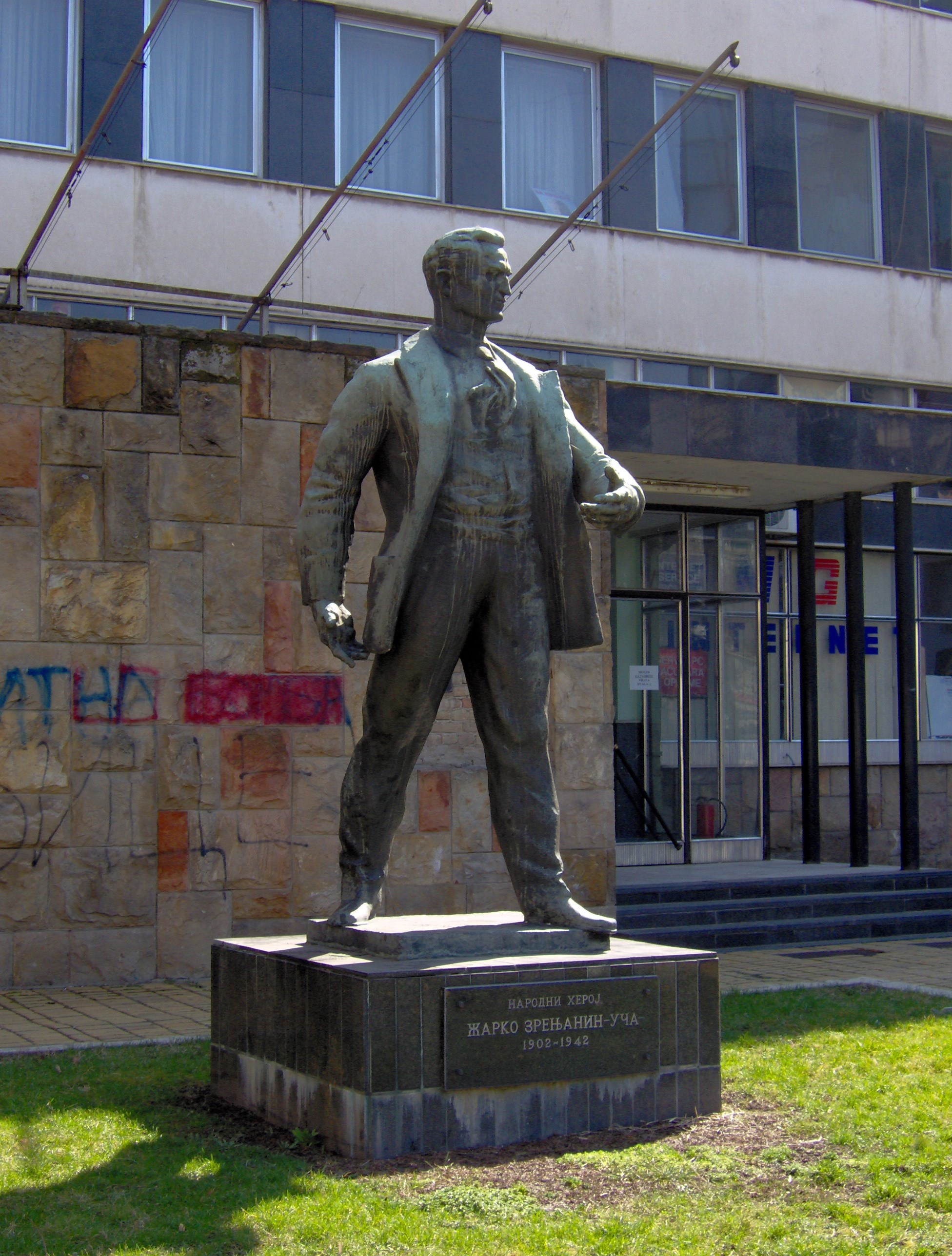
Monument of Žarko Zrenjanin in Zrenjanin, built in 1952
