= Half-life (disambiguation) =

Half-life is a mathematical and scientific description of exponential or gradual decay.

Half-life, half life or halflife may also refer to:

== Film ==
- Half-Life (film), a 2008 independent film by Jennifer Phang
- Half Life: A Parable for the Nuclear Age, a 1985 Australian documentary film

== Literature ==
- Half Life (Jackson novel), a 2006 novel by Shelley Jackson
- Half-Life (Krach novel), a 2004 novel by Aaron Krach
- Halflife (Michalowski novel), a 2004 novel by Mark Michalowski
- Rozpad połowiczny (Half-Life), a 1988 award-winning dystopia novel by Edmund Wnuk-Lipiński

== Music ==
- Half Life (3 album) (2001)
- Halflife (EP), an EP by Lacuna Coil and the title track
- Half-Life E.P., an EP by Local H
- "Half Life", a song by 10 Years from The Autumn Effect
- "Half Life", a song by Come from Near-Life Experience
- "Half-Life", a song by Duncan Sheik from Daylight
- "Half Life", a song by Imogen Heap from her album Ellipse
- "Half Life", a song by Prototype from the album Trinity
- "Half Life", a song by Survivor from the album Caught in the Game
- "Half Life", a song by Swans from the album Cop
- "Half Life", a song by Trocadero from the album Roses Are Red, Violets Are Blue
- "Half-Life", a song by X Ambassadors from the album Townie
- Halflives, a French-Italian alternative rock band

== Television episodes ==
- "Half-Life", Icons season 3, episode 17 (2004)
- "Half-Life", Odyssey 5 episode 17 (2002)
- "Half Life", La Femme Nikita season 2, episode 7 (1998)
- "Half Life", Logan's Run episode 6 (1977)
- "Half Life", Medical Investigation episode 17 (2005)
- "Half Life", New Tricks series 8, episode 9 (2011)
- "Half Life", Sea Patrol season 3, episode 7 (2009)
- "Half Life", SeaChange season 3, episode 13 (2000)

== Video games ==
- Half-Life (series), a video game series developed by Valve
  - Half-Life (video game), the first game in the series
  - Half-Life: Blue Shift, expansion to Half-Life
  - Half-Life: Opposing Force, expansion to Half-Life
  - Half-Life: Decay, multiplayer expansion to Half-Life
  - Half-Life 2, the second game in the series
  - Half-Life 2: Lost Coast, expansion to Half-Life 2 that happens somewhere in-between chapters of Half-Life 2
  - Half-Life 2: Episode One, a shorter game following the events of Half-Life 2
  - Half-Life 2: Episode Two, a shorter game following the events of Episode One
  - Half-Life: Alyx, a prequel to the events in Half-Life 2

== See also ==
- Biological half-life, the time it takes for a substance to lose half of its pharmacologic, physiologic, or radiologic activity
- Effective half-life, the effective radioactive half-life in organisms after accounting for excretion
- Half-life of knowledge, the amount of time that has to elapse before half of the knowledge or facts in a particular area is superseded or shown to be untrue
- Half a Life (disambiguation)
