= Veliky Guslyar =

Fictional city by Kir Bulychov

External image
- "A map of Veliky Guslyar and Its Surrounds, with Some of Its Wonders Depicted". Mir Fantastiki, 2013, no 11, vol. 123, p. 97.

Veliky Guslyar or Veliky Gusliar (Russian: Великий Гусляр is a fictional Russian town created by the Russian writer Kir Bulychev for his humorous science fiction stories. It is a place where various wonders and fantastic encounters with aliens happen to ordinary people.

The prototype of Veliky Guslyar is Veliky Ustyug. However, the names of the recurring characters, such as Korneliy Udalov, Nikolay Lozhkin, or Aleksandr Grubin, were taken from the address book of Vologda for 1913. On the other hand, the name of the absent-minded professor Lev Khristoforovich Mints (Лев Христофорович Минц) was taken from Bulychev's friend, Lev Mironovich Mints, upon his request.

The introduction to the second part of the 1972 collection Чудеса в Гусляре (Guslyar Wonders) gives a (fictional) detailed description of the town, its history, economy, demography, and an explanation why aliens when visiting the Earth, of all places, pick Veliky Guslyar.

The first story of the cycle is Связи личного характера ("Svyazi Llichnogo Haraktera", translated as "The Personal Touch" in 1983) published in Znanie-Sila magazine, 1970, no 6, pp. 47-48. There is an apocryphal story that it was first published in 1967. In fact, in 1967, while in Bulgaria, Bulychev wrote a "potboiler" short story, translated in Bulgarian as Неоспоримото доказателство ("Irrefutable evidence") published in magazine Kosmos. Returning to the Soviet Union, Bulychev wrote "Svyazi Llichnogo Haraktera", a different story with the same plot idea.

== Works ==
- Марсианское зелье (The Martian Potion, 1971)
- Нужна свободная планета (A Free Planet Needed, 1977)
- Глубокоуважаемый микроб (Dear Mr Microbe, 1987)
- Перпендикулярный мир (Perpendicular World, 1989)
- Over 130 short stories, published in seven volumes:
  - Чудеса в Гусляре (Miracles in Guslar)
  - Пришельцы в Гусляре (Aliens in Guslar)
  - Возвращение в Гусляр (Return to Guslar)
  - Гусляр-2000 (Guslar-2000)
  - Господа гуслярцы (Gentlemen Guslarians)
  - Гусляр навеки (Guslar Forever)
  - Письма в редакцию (Letters to the Editorial Office)

There is a crossover story, in which Alisa Seleznyova, a girl from the future, decided to travel to the 20th-century Veliky Guslyar. First published as a short story "Alisa in Guslyar" (Алиса в Гусляре, 2000), it was soon expanded into a novel Alisa in the Land of Fantasies (Алиса в стране фантазий, 2000).

=== Traslations ===
Eight stories from the Veliky Guslyar cycle (and 8 others) were published in English in the collection Gusliar Wonders

- Gusliar Wonders: Introduction (aka Vstuplenie 1972 )
  History, economy, demographics, etc., of Veliky Guslyar
- Wunderbaby ( Lyonechka-Leonardo (Лёнечка-Леонардо), 1980 )
- Don't Make the Wizard Mad (Ne Gnevi Kolduna! ( Не гневи колдуна! ) 1978 )
- Reason in Captivity ( Razum v Plenu 1972 )
- Help Needed - Gusliar ( Nado Pomoch' 1972 )
- A Mine of Information ( Kladez' Mudrosti 1970 )
- Who Can Say?= ( Kak Ego Uznat'? 1972 )
- The Personal Touch ( Svyazi Llichnogo Haraktera 1970 )

== Adaptations ==
The 1981 short Golden Fishes is based on the story "Поступили в продажу золотые рыбки" ("Goldfish Are on Sale"). The local pet store starts selling goldfish and it turns out that they can grant three wishes.

The 1984 comedy film Chance is based on the novel "The Martian Potion". 300 years ago an alien gifted an elixir of youth to a resident of Veliky Guslar. For a long time he kept this secret, but eventually Guslyarites learn about the "Martian potion".

The 1988 comedy TV film The Fairytale Glade is losely based on the elements from short stories "Недостойный богатырь" ("The Unworthy Bogatyr") and "Районные соревнования по домино" ("District Dominoes Competition"). The portagonist Kuzma accidentally finds a sleeping beauty Marya and kisses her. However the local bureaucrats turned their bliss into a nightmare and eventually into a tragedy unhappy Marya eats a poison apple (a hint to the premedication of Pushkin's "speeping beauty"). Bulychev was unhappy with the adaptation and even wanted his name removed from the credits.

In 2024, a TV series Obvious Impossible was released, loosely based on Guslyar stories. The title is a pun on the Soviet popular science TV program Obvious — Impossible. While it is based on Bulychev's stories, the action in Guslyar happens in the modern times, with smartphones, drones, and all. The characters have different names and appearances, the stories were retold "modernized", and this has become a quiz for Bulychev's fans to guess who (in film) is who (in originals) and what episode was made from what. The series received mixed reviews.

A number of short stories were made into animated cartoons: «Кладезь мудрости», «Копилка», «Спутник икры» (based on «Прошедшее время»), «Свободный тиран», «Яблоня» и «Чудеса в Гусляре» (based on «Паровоз для царя»), criticized for poor puppet animation quality.
