= Escape from Tarkov =

2025 extraction shooter video game

- Developer: Battlestate Games
- Publisher: Battlestate Games
- Director: Nikita Buyanov
- Engine: Unity
- Platform: Windows
- Release: 15 November 2025
- Genre: First-person shooter
- Mode: Multiplayer

Escape from Tarkov is a multiplayer first-person tactical extraction shooter video game developed by Battlestate Games for Microsoft Windows. The game is set in the fictional Norvinsk region in northwestern Russia, where a war is taking place between two private military companies. Players join matches called "raids" in which they fight other players and bots for loot and aim to survive and escape.

Version 1.0 for the game was released on 15 November 2025.

== Gameplay ==
The developers of Escape from Tarkov refer to the game as a realistic and hardcore first-person shooter, survival video game that borrows elements from massively multiplayer online games. In its current state, Escape from Tarkov incorporates five different game modes: PMC raid, Scavenger raid, PvE, Practice, and Arena.

=== Raids ===
The game has a minimal HUD, with little on-screen information presented to the player.

In PMC raid mode, players start by arming themselves, selecting a map, time of day, then enter alone or with teammates.

Once in a raid, players are pitted against other PMCs and hostile NPC Scavengers which they have to either kill or evade. Players can scavenge a wide variety of items, including firearms, armor, medical items, food, drink and various valuables. Players can only "escape" with their loot by reaching designated extraction zones in the allotted time. Each raid lasts between 20 and 50 minutes depending on the map, and may contain up to 14 players.

When players die or fail to extract, they lose everything in their inventory, save for those put in a secure container with limited slots or those insured with in-game money, provided no other player has taken the insured items back to their stash.

In Scavenger raid mode, players are assigned a random loadout instead of having to bring their own equipment. They enter a random raid already in progress as a Scavenger, and will not be attacked by NPC Scavengers. Scavengers have their own extraction zones, some of which might overlap with PMCs'. After finishing a Scavenger raid, there is a cooldown before the mode becomes available again.

=== Maps ===
There are currently 13 maps available for players; each one being a different region of the city:

- Customs: a large outdoor industrial park;
- Factory: the interior of a small chemical plant;
- Interchange: a road junction with a huge shopping mall nearby;
- Lighthouse: an expansive area with a cargo train station, water treatment plant, chalet homes, and an island with a lighthouse;
- Reserve: a secret military base;
- Shoreline: a large map with multiple areas including a hydroelectric power plant, villages, and a health resort;
- Streets of Tarkov: a section of the downtown area;
- The Lab: a secret research facility operated by TerraGroup;
- The Labyrinth: a theme park built by one of TerraGroup's contractors;
- Woods: a formerly state-protected wildlife reserve;
- Ground Zero: a business center of Tarkov, where the TerraGroup headquarters is located and the place where the conflict began;
- Terminal: a massive cargo logistics hub serving as one of the last evacuation points out of Tarkov.
- Icebreaker: an enormous nuclear-powered icebreaker located in the Gulf of Finland.

Each map has a mix of indoor, outdoor and underground environment, with changing time of day and weather patterns affecting gameplay.

An option that combines all the locations into one that provides open world gameplay is also planned, and currently there is a system where players can opt to transit to other maps adjacent to the one they are already in rather than extracting to their stash immediately.

=== Combat ===
Escape from Tarkov's gameplay has been compared to military simulation games such as the ArmA series.

The game features over a hundred firearms, from pistols to machine guns and grenade launchers, each with different statistics such as recoil, weight, and ergonomics. Firearms can be found on maps, scavenged from dead enemies, bought from traders or the player to player flea market, or built by assembling their constituent components, such as the dust cover, grip, stock and barrel, each component affecting the weapon's statistics. Damage dealt is dependent on ammunition and type instead of the weapon, with each round having different statistics for damage, armor penetration, etc. The game features complex ballistics, such as ricochets, bullet drop, and bullet penetration.

Beside weapons, players can protect themselves with various equipment such as bulletproof vests or combat helmets. Character inventories are grid-based, with the size and shape dependent on the equipment (such as chest rigs, backpacks, etc.). Characters' carrying capacities are also limited by weight, which affects movement speed and stamina drain. Scavenging items can be time-consuming and risky, as each item is revealed individually instead of all at once, and characters cannot move while searching.

Players have fine control over their character's movement speed and crouch height. Nearly every action generates distinct noises that can be heard by other players. The game tracks individual rounds in each magazine, but does not provide this exact information to player beyond estimations such as empty, half-full, full, etc. There is no in-game map that tells players exactly where they are. They need to navigate the levels using their knowledge of in-game landmarks and points of interest.

Each of the character's major body parts has a separate health bar that can be depleted. Each "destroyed" body part incurs significant penalties. For example, a destroyed arm hinders aiming, reloading and searching; a destroyed stomach causes characters to constantly cough and wheeze, making them unable to hear enemies while alerting enemies to their position and depleting their energy and hydration levels at a faster rate. Certain status effects can only be fixed by specific medical supplies, such as bandages for bleeding or splints for fractures. The player must also maintain energy and hydration levels to avoid penalties such as health loss or being unable to sprint.

=== Hideout ===
Outside of raids, player characters stay in their hideout, which is an underground bomb shelter. With scavenged or purchased materials, players can build various facilities to gain in-game bonuses. These bonuses include reducing cooldown for Scavenger raids, increasing experience gained, and the ability to craft items.

Extra equipment and valuables can be stored in a stash to use in future raids, sold to NPC traders, or sold to other players via a virtual flea market. Players can also use the flea market to purchase the equipment they need, using in-game currencies such as Rubles, euros or USD. NPCs traders also give quests which increase their trader loyalty, enabling access to higher-tiered items and quests.

=== Character progression ===
Nearly every action the player character does (from moving, eating, to killing and looting enemies) grants experience points. These points count toward both upgrading individual skills and increasing the character's overall level. Higher skill levels make character more effective and efficient at the corresponding actions, while higher character levels unlock additional game features such as certain trader quests and the flea market.

== Plot ==
Escape from Tarkov is set in the fictional city of Tarkov, the capital of the Norvinsk Special Economic Zone in northwestern Russia between 2015 and 2026. Political scandals and collapse of corporations have resulted in the social breakdown of Tarkov and warring factions have turned the city into a shell of itself with sections of the city being under control of aggressive locals called Scavengers (or Scavs for short).

=== Factions ===
There are two PMC factions that players can choose: United Security (USEC), a Western-based company, hired by a corporation known as TerraGroup to cover up its illegal activities, and Battle Encounter Assault Regiment (BEAR), a company created by the Russian government to investigate these activities. Each faction has its own gameplay advantages as well as unique cosmetics. For example, USEC-based characters begin with greater experience on Western or NATO-based firearms, while BEAR-players receive the same bonus for Russian/Soviet firearms.

The primary opposing non-player character faction are the Scavengers, Tarkov locals that are typically hostile to both BEAR and USEC. Scavs are divided into several factions and tiers. Normal Scavs have low tier gear and weapons, and are the primary AI opponent and are playable on a cooldown timer. Besides basic Scavs, the game has Rogues, Cultists, Scav Raiders with better equipment, more complex behaviors, and specific spawn points. There are also Scav Bosses with more hitpoints, better equipment, more difficult AI, and some are accompanied by guards.

Battlestate Games will occasionally alter the spawn rates and maps on which the factions appear during special events.

== Development ==
Escape from Tarkov was developed by Battlestate Games, and began development in 2012. Nikita Buyanov, the lead developer, taught himself game development by making mods for Half-Life and The Elder Scrolls IV: Oblivion. Buyanov and the Battlestate Games staff gained their experience through working at Absolutsoft on their previous game Contract Wars. Both Escape from Tarkov and Contract Wars are set in what the developers refer to as the Russia-2028 universe. Some development staff also have experience from real-world military experience, with one being a former Spetsnaz operator.

The developers recorded some weapon sounds by recording real weapons in abandoned warehouses.

Over the course of the game's beta period, the developers have released regular game updates, including new features, maps, characters, and equipment. Major updates are often released with a "wipe", in which in-game progress for all players is reset.

=== EFT: Arena ===
In 2023, Battlestate Games released a separate competitive mode for the game called Escape from Tarkov: Arena (EFT: Arena), focused on short rounds and team-based matchmaking. EFT: Arena was published as a standalone product on the Epic Games Store on April 10, 2025, coinciding with the release of a battle pass system. The game has an esports scene, starting with a DreamHack tournament in 2023.

== Release ==
Battlestate Games has stated that Escape from Tarkov would be a traditional full purchase release without any free-to-play or microtransaction elements. The release on Steam launched November 15, 2025. The game is sold in four editions (Standard, Left Behind, Prepare for Escape, and the Unheard Edition), with each increasing edition having more starting equipment and a larger stash for the player to use than the previous.

Escape from Tarkov was launched as a closed alpha game that was first made available to select users on 4 August 2016. Battlestate Games then announced that the game would go into its extended alpha stage on 28 December 2016, which would be available to select users who preordered the game. This was the stage where Battlestate released the game in four preorder tiers, with the Edge of Darkness edition guaranteeing players access to the alpha build. All players who had access were subject to a non-disclosure agreement (NDA) and video coverage of the gameplay via streaming was limited to a few select players until 24 March 2017, when the NDA was lifted.

The game entered closed beta on 28 July 2017, being made available to all players no matter the pre-order edition they purchased. It received a substantial spike in popularity in early 2020 on Twitch, when a promotional event took place providing players with in-game items for watching streams. The increase in popularity led to server issues and long matching times. The game hit its peak concurrent player count of 200,000 in May 2020, following the release of a major update.

The developers have also published multiple live-action miniseries, the first of which is titled Raid, which consisted of five episodes from 29 March 2019 – 25 February 2021, released for free on YouTube. Battlestate also released a film version, comprising all of the episodes together, which has over 28 million views. Their second series, The Chronicles of Ryzhy, began on 16 October 2022, and concluded its first season on 9 December 2022. The second season is currently ongoing, and began on 7 April 2023.

On 20 August 2025, Battlestate Games released Escape from Tarkov patch 0.16.9.0, which added the "Friend from Norvinsk" questline. Within the Hideout minigame "TarGrad Tales", introduced in this quest, players discovered a QR code that linked to a "Prepare for Escape" video teasing a 1.0 release date of 15 November 2025. Shortly after the teaser was found, studio CEO Nikita Buyanov confirmed the date.

== Reception ==
In a 2018 preview of the closed beta, Heather Alexandra commented: "Tarkov is punishing, but there's a lot of fun to be found in mastering its complexities and slowly becoming a hardened mercenary." In PC Gamer, Steven Messner described the game as unearthing "a new vein of potential for online shooters", and commented positively on the way the game's systems lead players to value their equipment and recall stories about how they were acquired. Messner also emphasized that the survival elements and high difficulty level turn every win into an achievement and every loss into a lesson.

== Criticism ==
=== Cheating ===
The game has faced issues with rampant cheating and real money trading – the practice whereby players sell in-game currency for real-world money, violating the game's license agreement. In 2020, the developers cracked down on the practice of purchasing currency by trading expensive items with other players in-game, warning players to avoid "constant distribution of items in raids to other players". This caused confusion among players, as concerns were raised about the boundaries of legitimate item trading.

=== DMCA abuse allegations ===
Battlestate Games has been accused of abusing YouTube's DMCA system to remove negative videos of Escape from Tarkov. YouTube user Eroktic released a video accusing the company of leaking user information, resulting in Battlestate Games issuing DMCAs on 47 YouTube videos posted by the user, two of which were removed for allegedly spreading false information and the rest for spreading "negative hype". While Battlestate Games initially stated that they had only used DMCA claims on one user, it was later revealed that another YouTuber had received claims – both reported losing viewership and income as a result.

=== Employee misconduct on Twitch ===
The Battlestate Games Twitch account was temporarily banned in December 2019 after an employee pointed an empty gun at his head and pulled the trigger while streaming on the website.

=== Lack of female characters ===
In a 2016 interview, one of the game's developers stated that there would be no women or playable female characters in the game because "women can't handle that amount of stress. There's only place for hardened men in this place." After apologizing for the comments, Battlestate Games clarified their position in 2020, stating that while the employee's comments did not reflect the company's position or opinion as a whole, there would be no playable female characters due to "game lore and more importantly, the huge amount of work needed with animations, gear fitting, etc." Battlestate Games also stated that the employee would be reprimanded for his comments.

=== Unheard Edition ===
In April 2024, Battlestate Games announced a new purchasable version of the game referred to as the Unheard Edition, which includes features such as exclusive equipment and access to an exclusive PvE server. In January of the same year, another version of Escape from Tarkov, the limited-time Edge of Darkness Edition, which was cheaper than the new edition, had been discontinued. Prior to that, Battlestate Games had stated that owners of the Edge of Darkness Edition would receive "free access to all subsequent DLCs" for the game. With the announcement of the Unheard Edition (whose PvE mode was labeled a "feature" and thus non-DLC), this was then revised to six months of free access, resulting in criticism from the game's player base and accusations of turning the game into a pay-to-win title. On 27 April, the developers announced that purchasers of the Edge of Darkness Edition would now be given full access to the PvE mode once version 1.0 of the game was released, slated for later in the year, and that those players would also be granted a 50% discount in upgrading to The Unheard Edition should they choose to do so. The following day, Battlestate Games revised their statement to make access open sooner, but in waves as more server capacity is added. On 18 July, Battlestate Games launched the PvE mode as a purchasable expansion for players who did not own the Unheard or Edge of Darkness editions.
