= Escape from Tarkov: Arena =

2025 video game

- Developer: Battlestate Games
- Publisher: Battlestate Games
- Designer: Nikita Buyanov
- Composer: Nikita Buyanov
- Series: Escape from Tarkov
- Engine: Unity
- Platform: Windows
- Release: April 10, 2025
- Genre: First-person shooter
- Mode: Multiplayer

Escape from Tarkov: Arena is a multiplayer tactical first-person shooter video game in development by Battlestate Games for Microsoft Windows. As with the original game, Arena is set in the fictional Norvinsk region in northwestern Russia. Players join 5v5 matches of 12-round fights.

== Gameplay ==
Escape from Tarkov: Arena consists of Blast Gang and Teamfight. Teamfight consists of 5v5 gunfight, 13 rounds. Progress will be shared between Arena and the base Escape From Tarkov.

== Release ==
Escape from Tarkov: Arena was released on the Epic Games Store on April 10, 2025, coinciding with the release of a battle pass system. The game has an esports scene, starting with a DreamHack tournament in 2023.

== Updates ==
In April 2026, Escape From Tarkov: Arena will have an engine upgrade to Unity 6.
