= Pavlo Pavlish =

Ukrainian politician

- Павло Павліш
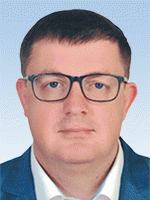
- Official portrait, 2019

People's Deputy of Ukraine
- Incumbent
- Assumed office 29 August 2019
- Preceded by: Oleksandr Spivakovskyi
- Constituency: Kherson Oblast, No. 182

Personal details
- Born: 10 December 1979 (age 46) Vilne, Ukrainian SSR, Soviet Union (now Ukraine)
- Party: Servant of the People
- Other political affiliations: Independent
- Education: Kherson State Agricultural University; National University Odesa Law Academy

Pavlo Vasylovych Pavlish (Ukrainian: Павло Васильович Павліш; born 10 December 1979) is a Ukrainian politician currently serving as a People's Deputy of Ukraine from Servant of the People, representing Ukraine's 182nd electoral district since 29 August 2019.

== Early life and career ==
Pavlo Vasylovych Pavlish was born on 10 December 1979 in the village of Vilne, in Ukraine's southern Kherson Oblast. He is a graduate of the Kherson State Agricultural University, specialising in organisational management, and the National University Odesa Law Academy, specialising in jurisprudence.

Prior to his election, Pavlish was a lecturer at Kherson State Agricultural University and director of Pravochyn Law Firm. He is additionally the founder of Euro Trade Engineering LLC and the non-governmental organisation "Skadovsk, Our Home".

== Political career ==
Before being elected as a People's Deputy of Ukraine, Pavlish unsuccessfully campaigned to become a member of the Kherson Oblast Council in 2006, 2010, and 2015. He also worked as an assistant to Governor of Kherson Oblast Andrii Gordieiev at public events.

During the 2019 Ukrainian presidential election, Pavlish headed the campaign of Volodymyr Zelenskyy in Kherson Oblast.

=== People's Deputy of Ukraine ===
Pavlish ran in the 2019 Ukrainian parliamentary election as the candidate of Servant of the People to be People's Deputy of Ukraine from Ukraine's 182nd electoral district. At the time of the election, he was an independent. He was successfully elected, defeating former People's Deputy and future Russian collaborationist leader Volodymyr Saldo (Opposition Platform — For Life) with 38.80% of the vote to Saldo's 16.10%.

In the Verkhovna Rada (parliament of Ukraine), Pavlish joined the Servant of the People faction, as well as the Verkhovna Rada Legal Committee. On 5 October 2022, he became deputy chairman of the committee.
