= Doctor Pavlysh =

Fictional doctor from novels by Kir Bulychev

Doctor Pavlysh (Russian: Павлыш) is a character in a series of science fiction works of Russian writer Kir Bulychev. Doctor Vladislav Vladimirovich Pavlysh is a ship's doctor of the space fleet. In some stories he is the main protagonist, while in others he is a secondary character. He also appears in a number of Bulychev's fanfics.

The prototype of doctor Pavlysh was ship's doctor on the bulk carrier ship Segezha (Note: Segezha is a Russian town.) on which Bulychev travelled as a journalist in 1967. Doctor Pavlysh and the spaceship Segezha appear in the first novel of the cycle, The Last War (1970).

== Doctor Pavlysh cycle ==
Seven major Doctor Pavlysh novels were published in the omnibus volume Доктор Павлыш. Закон для дракона, 2002, ISBN 9785170149568

- The Last War (Russian: Последняя война, 1970)
  A postapocalyptic novel about a visit to a planet shortly after a nuclear war on it. Bulychev wrote that it was his first science fiction novel
- Великий дух и беглецы (1972)
  Doctor Pavlysh counteracts an aggressive progressorship by another civilization on a planet with primitive society.
- Half a Life, 1973, translated into English in the collection under the same title
  On a marooned alien automated spaceship Pavlysh finds a diary of a Russian woman, who was abducted to the spaceship and spent half of her life there, together with other abducted aliens.
- Закон для дракона (A Law for a Dragon, 1975)
  Pavlysh lands on a planet where a research station started to be plagued by mosquitoes and dragons, which did not happen before. Pavlysh resolves the puzzle.
- Садовник в ссылке ("A Gardener in Exile", 1975, a short story).
  Pavlysh meets a fan of Nikolai Gogol who traveled to the past and retrieved a photocopy of the second volume of Dead Souls, which Gogol burned. He was exiled as a punishment when he was caught preparing to a duel with d'Anthès, who killed Alexander Pushkin.
- Белое платье Золушки (Cinderella's White Dress, 1980)
  Its first chapter, О некрасивом биоформе was published in 1974 as a separate short story and translated into English as "An Ugly Bioform". It does not mention Pavlysh. Bioforms are humans modified to better perform their jobs in extreme conditions.
  Pavlysh is introduced in the second chapter. During a carnival in Moonport Pavlysh was attracted to a strange girl Marina, who quickly disappears leaving him a short note. In several months he finds himself on a newly discovered planet tentatively called "Project-18", where he learns that Marina is here as well, but she avoids him. During an planetquake he rescues a white bird, which turns out to be Marina bioformed.
  The novel was translated into Polish as "Białe skrzydła Kopciuszka [White Wings of Cinderella]
- Тринадцать лет пути [= Тринадцать лет полёта] (1984)
  A prequel to the Pavlysh series, in which Pavlysh is a medical cadet on a spaceship "Antey", which is on its route for 106 years already. The problem with time in space travel is resolved by teleporting the crew in shifts. When 13 years was left to go the teleport malfunctioned...
- Посёлок (The Settlement, 1988, translated as Those Who Survive
- Пленники долга (2009)
  A short story published posthumously. Bulychev intended it to include into the novel The Settlement, however the plot changed its course and the piece was left unfinished.

The 2016 book Последняя война (The Last War) published by Azbuka-Attikus, in addition to Pavlysh novels, included the several short stories, which the editors felt to belong to the "world of Pavlysh". These stories areabout Gleb Bauer, a major character in the Pavlysh cycle, with the exception of Red Deer, in which Pavlysh is mentioned.

- «Так начинаются наводнения» (1967)
- «Хоккей Толи Гусева» (1968)
- «Пустой дом» (1972)
- «Красный олень, белый олень» (1973, translated as Red Deer, White Deer in the Half a Life collection)
- «Снегурочка» (1973, translated as "Snowmaiden" in Half a Life)
- «Загадка Химеры» (1979)

=== Fanfics ===
Short stories from the anthology Искушение чародея ("The Temptation of the Sorcerer"), dedicated to the memory of Kir Bulychev, Eksmo, 2013

- Отчего люди (2013), Volodymyr Arenev
- Охота на Белую смерть (2013) Сергей Пальцун
- Контакт (2013) Олег Пелипейченко
- Во спасение (2013), Владимир Марышев
- Далёкое, близкое (2013) Сергей Звонарёв
- Неприкасаемые (2013) Ника Батхен
- Планета, на которой не умирают (2013), Игорь Вереснев
