= Kherson State University =

Public university in Kherson, Ukraine

Coordinates: 46.6464°N 32.6299°E

- ДЗВО "Херсонський державний університет"
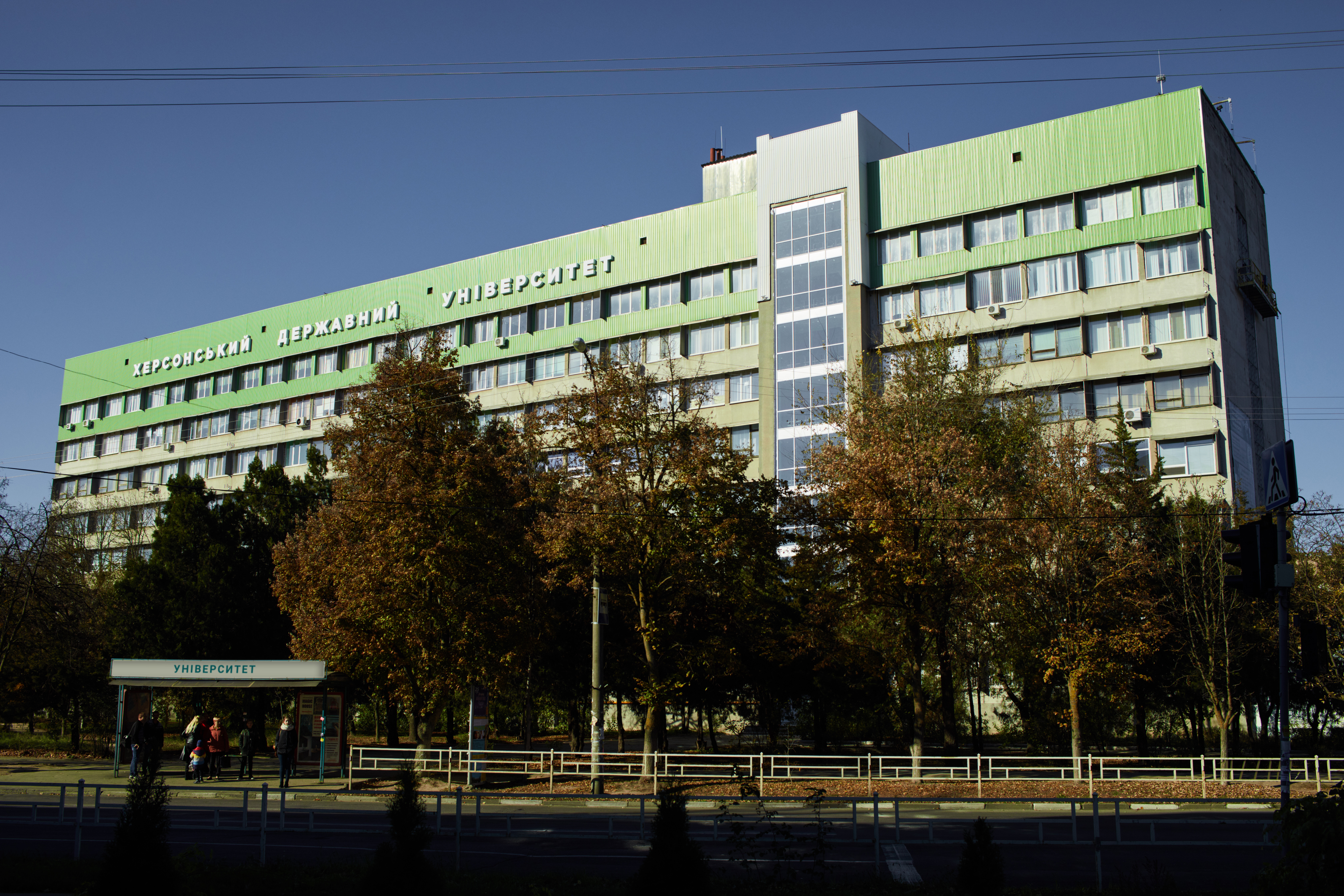
- Motto: Sapere aude!
- Type: Public university
- Established: 1917
- Affiliations: Ministry of Education and Science of Ukraine
- Rector: Aleksander Spivakovsky
- Students: 5929
- Location: Kherson, Ukraine
- Website: www.kspu.edu
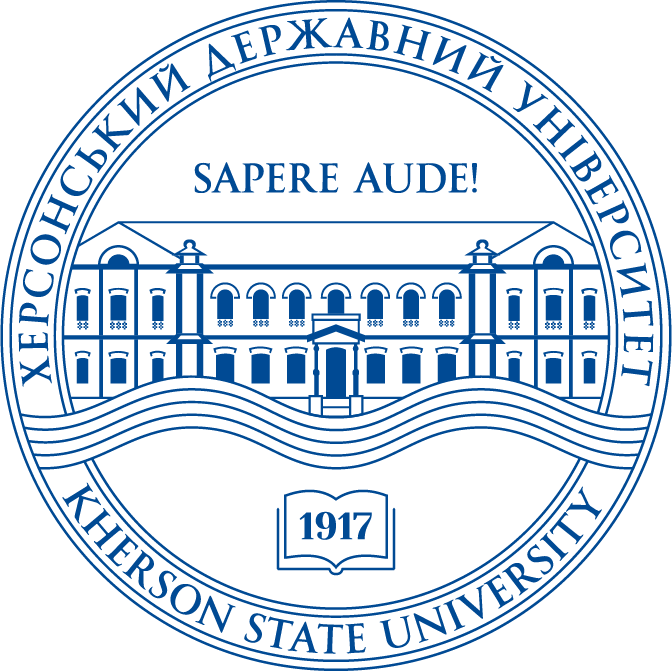

The Kherson State University is one of the oldest state-sponsored universities in southern Ukraine, and acts as a centre of educational, scientific, pedagogical, and cultural activities.

As of 2024, Kherson State University is attended by approximately 8000 students from 23 regions of Ukraine and other CIS countries. Its faculty and staff include 18 academicians, various members of Ukrainian and foreign academies of science, 68 professors, 234 senior lecturers, 650 post-graduate students, and about 1000 lecturers and employees. Kherson State conducts scientific-educational work with institutes of higher education located in Kyiv, Odessa, and the Crimea. Its campus contains 4 educational buildings and laboratories, agricultural and biological research stations, a library, recreation zones on the Dnipro bank and on the Black Sea shore, a students' café, a students' club, a sports club, an observatory, three gymnasiums, two conference halls, and an agricultural machinery building.

== History ==
KSU was founded in November 1917 during the First World War. It was modelled on the then-evacuated Tartu Teachers Institute. In 1919 the school was reorganized into Kherson Pedagogical Institute.

In the early 1920s, the institute was renamed to Kherson Institute of Education (Hino), and in November 1924 it was given the name of NK Krupskaya. During World War II from August 1941 to March 1944 the Institute ceased operations.

In March 1944, after the release of Kherson from Axis invaders, it resumed the educational process in 6 departments: physical, mathematical, scientific, linguistic and literary, geographical, and historical. In 1973 it opened a Faculty of General Sciences, in 1977 a Faculty of Education, and in 1986 a Faculty of Foreign Languages.

In the years following Ukraine's independence, the Institute continued to develop. In 1992, the postgraduate program at the Faculty of Philology created additional pedagogical skills and retraining of Ukrainian Philology and Foreign Languages.

In 1994 the university opened a school of physical education and sport, and Kherson Academic Lyceum at KSU. In 1998, Kherson State Pedagogical Institute was reorganized as Kherson State Pedagogical University, which in 2002 became the Kherson State University. In 2004 it established the Research Institute of Information Technology. In April 2005 it opened the Business Development Centre.

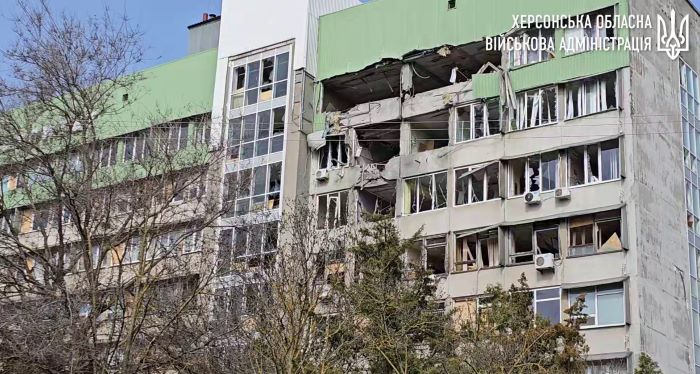
Main building after shelling in March 2024

The university buildings were shelled several times by Russian forces during the Russian invasion of Ukraine. A swimming pool, lyceum, observatory and main building of the university were damaged by the bombardments.

== See also ==
List of universities in Ukraine
