= Kir Bulychev =

Russian science fiction writer (1934–2003)

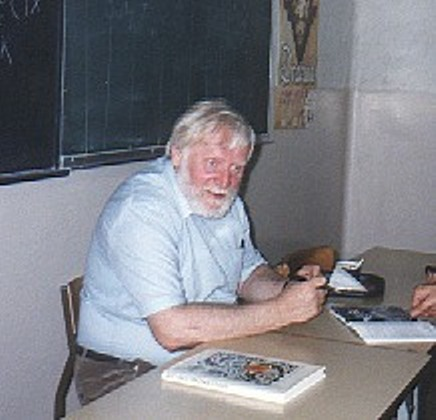
- Bulychev in 1997
- Born: Igor Vsevolodovich Mozheiko; 18 October 1934; Moscow, Soviet Union
- Died: September 5, 2003 (aged 68); Moscow, Russia
- Education: Maurice Thorez Moscow State Pedagogical Institute of Foreign Languages
- Occupation: Oriental studies
- Writing career
- Pen name: Kir Bulychev
- Language: Russian
- Genre: Science fiction
- Notable works: Alisa Selezneva series Guslar series
- Notable awards: Aelita Prize 1997

Kir Bulychev (Russian: Кир Булычёв, romanized: Kir Bulychyov; 18 October 1934 – 5 September 2003) was the pen name of Igor Vsevolodovich Mozheiko (Russian: И́горь Все́володович Може́йко), a Soviet and Russian science fiction writer, critic, translator and historian. His magnum opus is a children's science fiction series Alisa Seleznyova, although most of his books are adult-oriented. His books were adapted for film, television, and animation over 20 times – more than any other Russian science fiction author – and Bulychev himself wrote scripts for early adaptations.

== Biography ==
Mozheiko (Mojeiko) received a Master's degree in 1965 and a Ph.D. in 1981. From 1963 he worked in the Institute of Oriental Studies of the USSR Academy of Sciences. He was a specialist in the medieval history of Burma and wrote a biography of Aung San.

He first used the pseudonym Kir Bulychev in 1965, for his very first science fiction story, "A Girl Nothing Can Happen To". It was the first in what would become his most popular book series, Alisa Seleznyova, that eventually comprised more than 50 novellas and short stories. This children's science fiction series is centered around the titular heroine, a teenage girl from the future, who travels through space and time, solves mysteries, makes discoveries and saves endangered peoples and species. Bulychov kept writing Alisa for the rest of his life: the last book appeared in 2003, months before his death. There were four animated and three life-action adaptations of Alisa stories, as well as tie-in comics and video games.

Another of Bulychev's best-known works is a series of short stories about Veliky Guslar, a Russian town that attracts all kinds of aliens and supernatural beings. This fictional city is based on the real city of Veliky Ustyug.

He also wrote many standalone science fiction novels.

Bulychev wrote scripts for more than 20 movies: according to Mir Fantastiki magazine, he is the most adapted Russian science fiction author. Besides his own writing, he translated numerous American science fiction stories into Russian.

== Selected bibliography ==
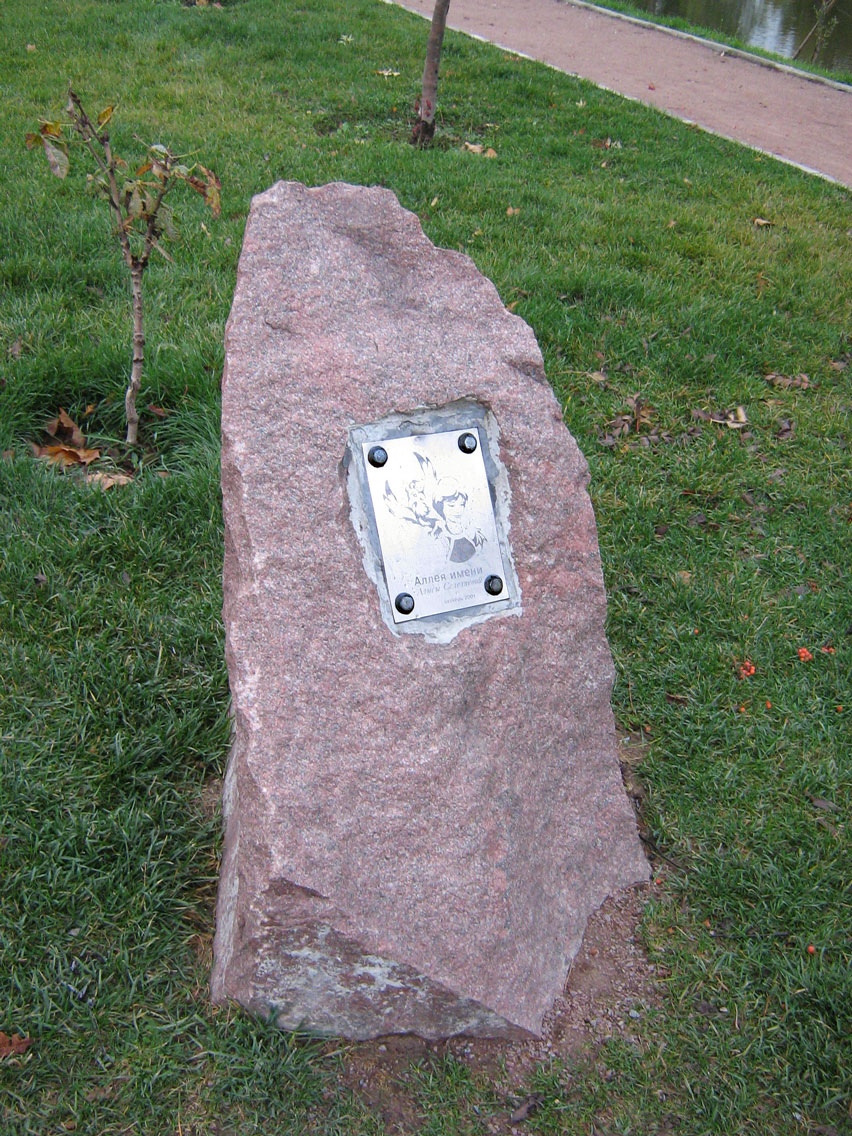
Memorial stone at the Alisa Seleznyova alley in Moscow

Only novels and novellas included.

=== Alisa Seleznyova series ===
- Ржавый фельдмаршал (The Rusty Field Marshal, 1968)
- Путешествие Алисы (Alisa's Voyage, 1974)
- День рождения Алисы (Alisa's Birthday, 1974)
- Миллион приключений (A Million Adventures, 1976)
- Сто лет тому вперёд (One Hundred Years Ahead, 1978)
- Пленники астероида (Prisoners of an Asteroid, 1981)
- Лиловый шар (The Lilac Ball, 1983)
- Заповедник сказок (The Reserve of Fairy Tales, 1985)
- Козлик Иван Иванович (Ivan Ivanovich the Goat, 1985)
- Гай-до (Guy-do, 1986)
- Конец Атлантиды (The End of Atlantis, 1987)
- Город без памяти (The City Without Memory, 1988)
- Подземная лодка (The Underground Boat, 1989)
- Война с лилипутами (The War Against the Lilliputians, 1992)
- Алиса и крестоносцы (Alisa and the Crusaders, 1993)
- Излучатель доброты (The Kindness Ray, 1994)
  Crossover note: In this tale Alisa meets Kora Orvat from another cycle, a tall attractive blue-eyed blonde with higher education and knowledge of Chinese
- Дети динозавров (Dinosaur Children, 1995)
- Сыщик Алиса (Alisa the Detective, 1996)
- Привидений не бывает (Ghosts Don't Exist, 1996)
- Опасные сказки (Dangerous Tales, 1997)
- Планета для тиранов (A Planet for Tyrants, 1997)
- Секрет чёрного камня (The Secret of the Black Stone, 1999)
  Crossover note: Alisa sympathizes with Kora Orvat (who is 23 years old at this time) and wants to become the same as Kora when she grows up
- Алиса и чудовище (Alisa and the Monster, 1999)
- Alisa in the Land of Fantasies (Алиса в стране фантазий, 2000)
- Звёздный пёс (The Star Dog, 2001)
- Вампир Полумракс (Twilights the Vampire, 2001)
- Алиса и Алисия (Alisa and Alicia, 2003)

=== Veliky Guslyar series ===
- Марсианское зелье (The Martian Potion, 1971)
- Нужна свободная планета (A Free Planet Needed, 1977)
- Глубокоуважаемый микроб (Dear Mr Microbe, 1987)
- Перпендикулярный мир (Perpendicular World, 1989)
- Over 130 short stories, published in seven volumes:
  - Чудеса в Гусляре (Miracles in Guslar)
  - Пришельцы в Гусляре (Aliens in Guslar)
  - Возвращение в Гусляр (Return to Guslar)
  - Гусляр-2000 (Guslar-2000)
  - Господа гуслярцы (Gentlemen Guslarians)
  - Гусляр навеки (Guslar Forever)
  - Письма в редакцию (Letters to the Editorial Office)

There is a crossover story, in which Alisa Seleznyova decided to travel to the 20th-century Veliky Guslyar. First published as a short story "Alisa in Guslyar" (Алиса в Гусляре, 2000), it was soon expanded into a novel Alisa in the Land of Fantasies (Алиса в стране фантазий, 2000).

=== Doctor Pavlysh series ===
- Последняя война (The Last War, 1970)
- Великий дух и беглецы (The Great Spirit and the Refugees, 1972)
- Половина жизни (Half a Life, 1973)
- Закон для дракона (A Law for a Dragon, 1975)
- Белое платье Золушки (Cinderella's White Dress, 1980)
- Тринадцать лет пути (Thirteen Years in Flight, 1984)
- Посёлок (The Settlement, 1988, translatad as Those Who Survive)
- Пленники долга (Prisoners of Duty, 2009)

=== Cora Orvat ("InterGPol") series ===
A series of ironic science fiction crime/mystery stories featuring the super-agent Cora Orvat (Russian: Кора Орват) of the Intergalactic Police (InterGpol).

In his interviews Bulychev said that he planned Kora as an adult Alisa. However later he lost interest in this idea and he even made them to meet each other in order to see them separately.

- Покушение на Тесея (An Attempted Murder of Theseus, 1994)
- В куриной шкуре (In a Hen's Skin, 1994)
  Cora has solve the murder of professor Gallieni doing archeological research on the planet Dil-li. Cora's body was disintegrated in an explosion and she had to carry out an investigation in the next best available body, that of an alien, and it turned out to be a giant chicken.
- Предсказатель прошлого (The One Who Can Predict the Past, 1994)
  Cora finds an illegal time machine. (Personality notes: We learn that Kora "had a weakness for strong and impudent men" and her grandmother Anastasya Tadeushevna Orvat lives in "Vologda Oblast, Velikoguslyarsky Raion, village Pyany Bor [Drunk Forest]".)
- Последние драконы (The Last Dragons, 1994)
  Cora solves the mystery of the disappearance of dragons, the national treasure of the state of Liondor
- Детский остров (The Children's Island, 1995)
  The story tells that Kora was found sevn months old on the planet Zrofilla. She learned that she comes from the family Poles exiled in the 19th century to Vologda region. She was born in Veliky Guslyar to Maksim Orvat, a geologist, and Alina Udalova; both went missing during an expedition.
- Исчезновение профессора Лу Фу [The Disappearance of Professor Lu Fu] (1995)
  First serialized in 1994-1995, under the title Похищение [Abduction] in the children's newspaper Pionerskaya Pravda, later slightly reworked. A heavily reworked variant for children under the title Излучатель доброты [The Emitter of Kindness] was included in the Alisa Seleznyova cycle, in which Cora is only a supporting character.
- На полпути с обрыва (Halfway Down the Ridge, 1995)
- Зеркало зла (The Mirror of Evil, 1996)

In addition, Планета для тиранов (A Planet for Tyrants, 1997) from Alisa Seleznyova series is a crossover with the Cora Orvat series

=== River Chronos series ===
- Река Хронос (River Chronos, 1992)
- Заповедник для академиков (The Academicians' Reserve, 1992)
- Усни, красавица (Sleep, Beauty, 1994)
- Купидон (Cupid, 1998)
- Таких не убивают (Those are not to be Killed, 1998)
- Младенец Фрей (Baby Frei, 2000)
- Дом в Лондоне (A House in London, 2003)

=== Andrey Bruce duology ===
- Агент КФ (SF Agent, 1984)
- Подземелье ведьм (The Witches' Dungeon, 1987)

=== Non-serialized ===
- Умение кидать мяч (A Talent for Throwing Balls, 1973)
- Похищение чародея (Abduction of the Wizard, 1979)
- На днях землетрясение в Лигоне (The Upcoming Earthquake in Ligon, 1980)
- Два билета в Индию (Two Tickets to India, 1981)
- Тайна Урулгана (The Secret of Urulgan, 1991)
- Любимец (A Pet, 1993)
- Театр теней (Theatre of Shadows, 1998)

=== Books published in English ===
The dates given are the dates of English editions.

Science fiction:

- Alice: The Girl from Earth (translation of Alisa's Voyage, July 2002), ISBN 1401013112
- Half a Life (1977)
- Gusliar Wonders (1983)
- Earth and Elsewhere (1985)
- Abduction of the Wizard (1989)
- Those Who Survive (translation of The Village, 2000)

History:

- 1185 A.D. (1989)
- South-East Asia: Unity in Diversity. Ahmedabad: Allied (with Gennadi Chufrin) (1989).

== Film adaptations ==
All lifetime adaptations scripts were written by Bulychov himself.

=== Based on Alisa Seleznyova ===
- The Mystery of the Third Planet (1981), animated, based on Alisa's Voyage
- The Guest from the Future (1985), TV miniseries based on One Hundred Years Ahead
- The Lilac Ball (1987), based on the book of the same name
- Prisoners of Yamagiri-Maru (1988), animated, based on a story of the same name
- Island of Rusty General (1988), based on The Rusty Field Marshal

Posthumous:

- Alice's Birthday (2009), animated, based on the novella of the same name
- Alisa Knows What to Do! (2013), animated TV series, based on characters only
- One Hundred Years Ahead (2024), based on characters from the story of the same name

=== Based on Veliky Guslar ===
The 1981 short Golden Fishes is based on the story "Поступили в продажу золотые рыбки" ("Goldfish Are on Sale"). The local pet store starts selling goldfish and it turns out that they can grant three wishes.

The 1984 comedy film Chance is based on the novel "The Martian Potion". 300 years ago an alien gifted an elixir of youth to a resident of Veliky Guslar. For a long time he kept this secret, but eventually Guslyarites learn about the "Martian potion".

The 1988 comedy TV film The Fairytale Glade is losely based on the elements from short stories "Недостойный богатырь" ("The Unworthy Bogatyr") and "Районные соревнования по домино" ("District Dominoes Competition"). The portagonist Kuzma accidentally finds a sleeping beauty Marya and kisses her. However the local bureaucrats turned their bliss into a nightmare and eventually into a tragedy unhappy Marya eats a poison apple (a hint to the premedication of Pushkin's "speeping beauty"). Bulychev was unhappy with the adaptation and even wanted his name removed from the credits.

In 2024, a TV series Obvious Impossible was released, loosely based on Guslyar stories. The title is a pun on the Soviet popular science TV program Obvious — Impossible. While it is based on Bulychev's stories, the action in Guslyar happens in the modern times, with smartphones, drones, and all. The characters have different names and appearances, the stories were retold "modernized", and this has become a quiz for Bulychev's fans to guess who (in film) is who (in originals) and what episode was made from what. The series received mixed reviews.

A number of short stories were made into animated cartoons: «Кладезь мудрости», «Копилка», «Спутник икры» (based on «Прошедшее время»), «Свободный тиран», «Яблоня» и «Чудеса в Гусляре» (based on «Паровоз для царя»), criticized for poor puppet animation quality.

=== Other ===
- The Throw, or Everything Started on Saturday (1976), TV film, based on the story The Ability to Throw Ball
- Abduction of the Wizard (1981), TV film, based on a story of the same name
- Per Aspera Ad Astra (1981), based on an original script by Bulychev
- Tears Were Falling (1982)
- Comet (1983)
- Two Tickets to India (1985), animated, based on a story of the same name
- The Pass (1988), animated, based on Village
- The Witches Cave (1989), based on the novella of the same name
- Abduction of the Wizard (1989), based on a story of the same name

Posthumous:

- Obvious Impossible (2024), loosely based on Guslyar stories. The title is a pun on the Soviet popular science TV program Obvious — Impossible
