= Chance (1984 film) =

1984 film by Aleksandr Mayorov

- Directed by: Aleksandr Mayorov
- Written by: Kir Bulychev; Aleksandr Mayorov
- Starring: Irina Muravyova; Yury Yakovlev; Klara Luchko; Aleksandr Abdulov
- Cinematography: Grigoriy Belenskiy
- Edited by: Tatiana Egorycheva
- Music by: Alexey Rybnikov
- Production company: Mosfilm
- Release date: 1984
- Running time: 80 minutes
- Country: Soviet Union
- Language: Russian

Chance (Russian: Шанс) is a 1984 Soviet science fiction comedy film directed by Aleksandr Mayorov based on the short story The Martian Potion from the cycle Veliky Guslyar by Kir Bulychev.

== Plot ==
In the middle of the 17th century, a Cossack named Almaz Bity saves an alien from a certain death. In gratitude, he gives the Earthman an elixir of youth. By constantly using the elixir, Almaz and his girlfriend Militsa live until the 20th century. The time has come to regain youth, and Almaz returns to the city of Veliky Guslyar, where the secret means is kept. However, the mystery is revealed, and several residents of the city have the opportunity to experience the action of the "Martian Potion".

Second youth gives new strength to life to some, while others get nothing but problems and troubles. In the finale, the alien leaves a second chance to live anew only for those who really want and deserve it.

== Cast ==
- Sergey Plotnikov — Almaz Bity
- Igor Shkurin — Almaz Bity (young)
- Maria Kapnist — Militsa Fyodorovna
- Dilorom Kambarova — Militsa Fyodorovna (young)
- Raisa Kurkina — Elena Sergeevna
- Veronika Izotova — Elena Sergeevna (young)
- Viktor Pavlov — Corneliy Ivanovich Udalov
- Sasha Evteev — Corneliy Udalov (young)
- Lyudmila Ivanova — Ksenia Udalova
- Maya Menglet — Vanda Savich
- Elena Tonunts — Vanda Savich (young)
- Boris Ivanov — Nikita Savich
- Andrei Zaretsky — Nikita Savich (young)
- Igor Yasulovich — Aleksandr Grubin
- Sergey Zhigunov — Aleksandr Grubin (young)
- Vera Novikova — Shurochka
- Andrey Nikolaev — Misha Meyolkin
- Vadim Aleksandrov — The Alien
