= The Pass (1988 film) =

- Directed by: Vladimir Tarasov
- Written by: Kir Bulychov
- Distributed by: Soyuzmultfilm
- Release date: 1988 (USSR)
- Running time: 30 mins
- Country: Soviet Union
- Language: Russian

The Pass (Russian: Перевал, romanized: Pereval) is a 1988 Soviet animated short film, directed by Vladimir Tarasov and written by Kir Bulychov. It is adapted from the first chapter titled The Pass from Bulychyov's novel The Settlement, translated as Those Who Survive.

== Plot ==
In a distant sector of the galaxy, a scientific spacecraft, Pole, from Earth makes an emergency landing on an uninhabited planet. Due to a radiation leak during the landing, the surviving crew is forced to abandon the ship quickly, leaving behind essential supplies like food and weapons. Over 17 years, the survivors establish a settlement far from the spacecraft, adapting to primitive methods to survive and using basic weapons to fend off local predators.

The protagonist, Oleg, who was an infant during the crash, remembers nothing but life in the settlement. When a new expedition is planned to retrieve supplies from the spacecraft, Oleg, along with friends Dick and Mariana, sets out under the guidance of an elder, Thomas. Along the way, they encounter remnants of previous expeditions and face dangerous obstacles. After a series of hardships, including Thomas's sacrifice to save Oleg, the trio finally reaches the ship.

Inside, they discover supplies, functional blasters, and a food cache, experiencing Earth food for the first time. Oleg also finds his father’s blaster and uses it to defend his friends from a giant lizard. When Oleg stumbles upon the ship’s radio room and accidentally activates a signal, he realizes their only chance of rescue may lie in learning to operate the equipment. Taking books from the ship, they return to the settlement with plans to learn how to send a signal to Earth, followed by a domesticated creature, "the goat," now with offspring.
