= Izbište =

Izbište Избиште
- Village (Selo)
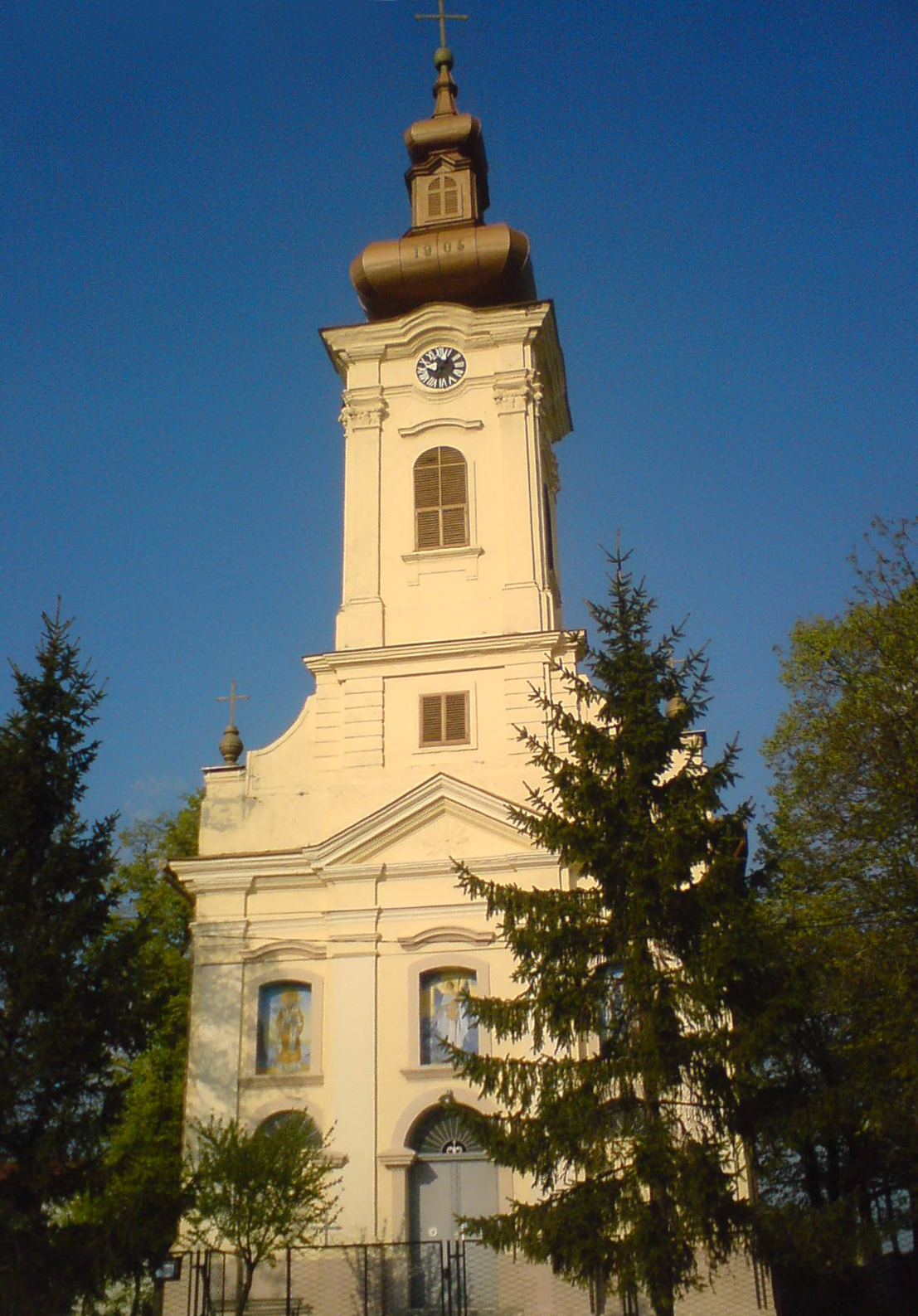
- The Orthodox Church

- Location of Izbište within Serbia Izbište (Serbia) Izbište (Europe)
- Coordinates: 45°01′07″N 21°11′07″E
- Country: Serbia
- Province: Vojvodina
- District: South Banat
- Municipality: Vršac
- Elevation: 100 m (330 ft)

Population (2011)
  - Izbište: 1,464
- Time zone: UTC+1 (CET)
  - Summer (DST): UTC+2 (CEST)
- Postal code: 26343
- Area code: +381(0)13
- Car plates: VŠ

Izbište (Serbian Cyrillic: Избиште, pronounced [ǐzbiːʃtɛ]; Hungarian: Izbistye) is a village in Serbia. It is situated in the Vršac municipality, in the South Banat District, Vojvodina province. The village has a Serb ethnic majority (86.74%) and its population is 1,464 according to the 2011 census.

== Name ==
In Serbian, the village is known as Izbište (Избиште), in Romanian as Pârneaora, in Hungarian as Izbistye, and in German as Izbischte.

== The first written evidence ==
The oldest preserved written document in which the mentioned populated place Izbište dates from 1660, and it follows that from 1666 year. In both cases it is a hand written scrapbook of Serbian Orthodox Church priest, who keeps track of the contributions of households. Scrapbook or "Katastig", as was then called, contains a list of financial and commodity contributions, which are, by any obligation or voluntarily, are given to Serbian Patriarchate of Peć. This document is now stored in the Library of Serbian Patriarchate.

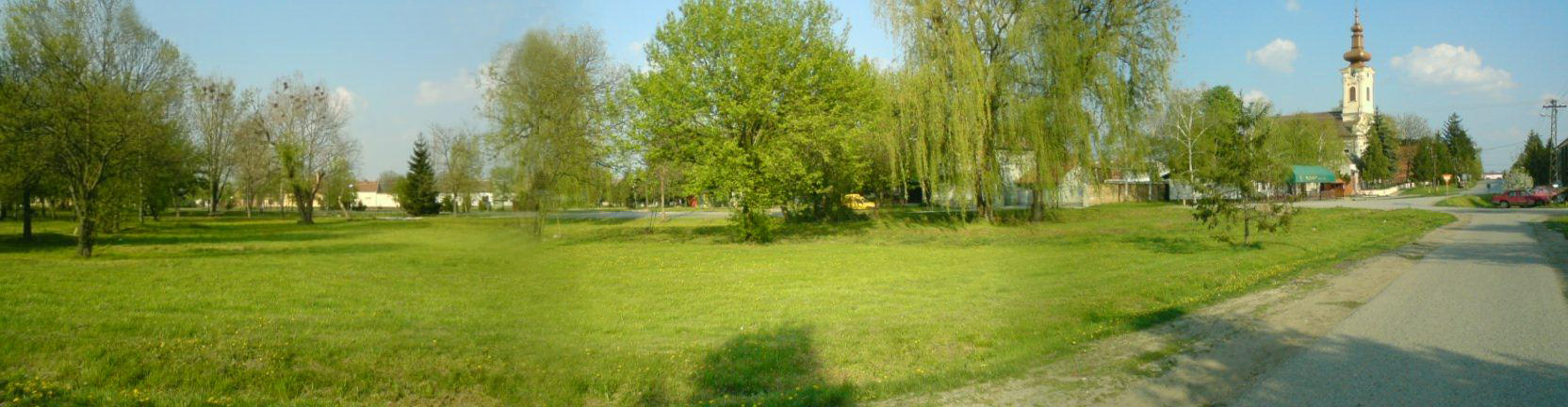
Izbište Street Panorama

== Famous residents ==
- Žarko Zrenjanin-Uča – people's hero of Yugoslavia, partisan and leader of communist movement in Vojvodina, was born in 1902 in Izbište.
- Isa Jovanović – people's hero, Yugoslav partisan, after the war a member of the Council of the Federation of the Federal People's Republic of Yugoslavia
- Anđa Jovanović-Ranković – people's hero, Yugoslav partisan, killed during World War II in Yugoslavia.

== Population ==
The post-war development of Izbište was stopped by the destruction of brick-field and power plant. Izbište had up to 3500 inhabitants, many of whom were educated and as such, went for Vršac, Bela Crkva, Pančevo, Belgrade and then continued their careers there.

== Gallery ==
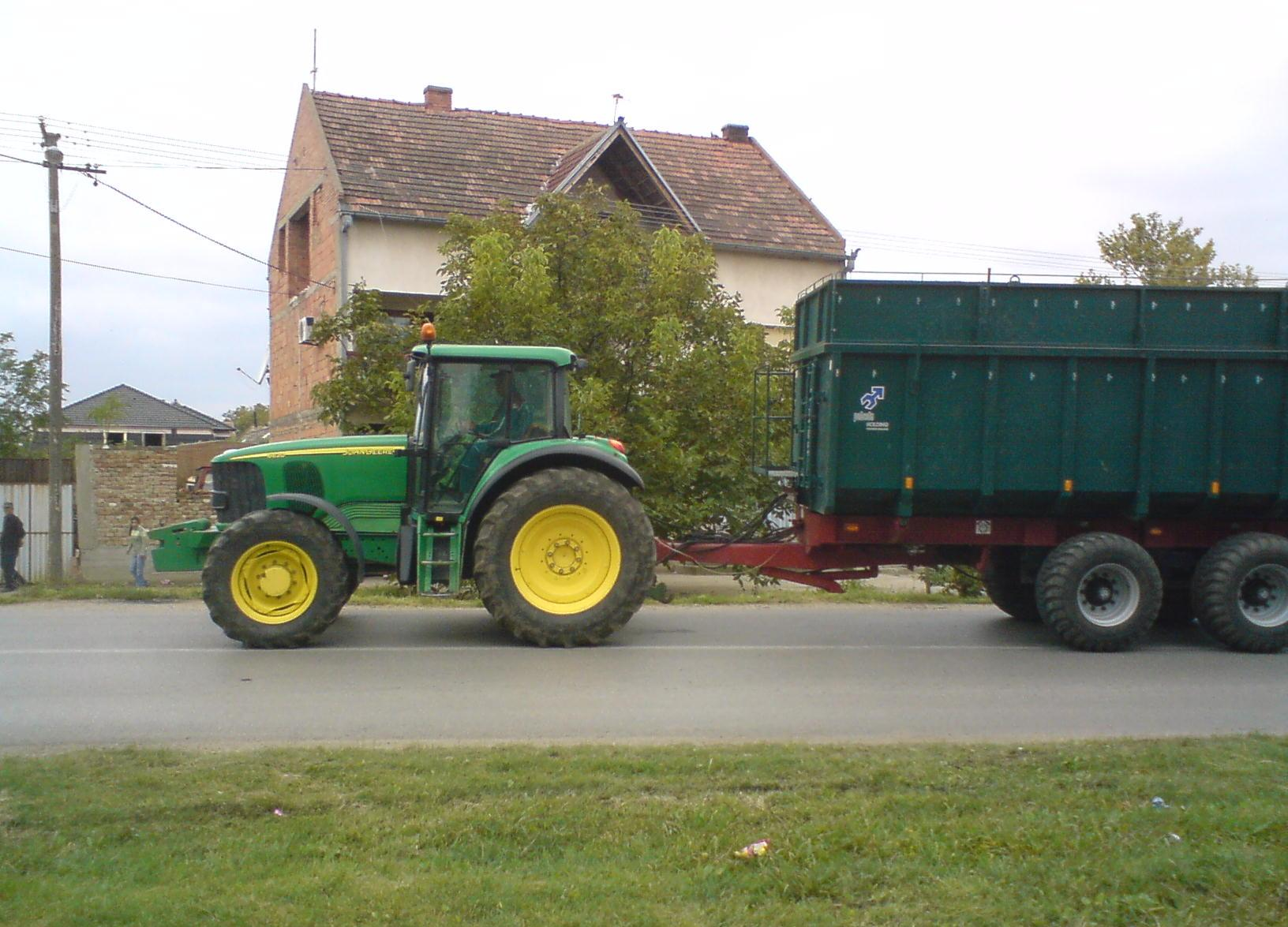
John Deere tractor

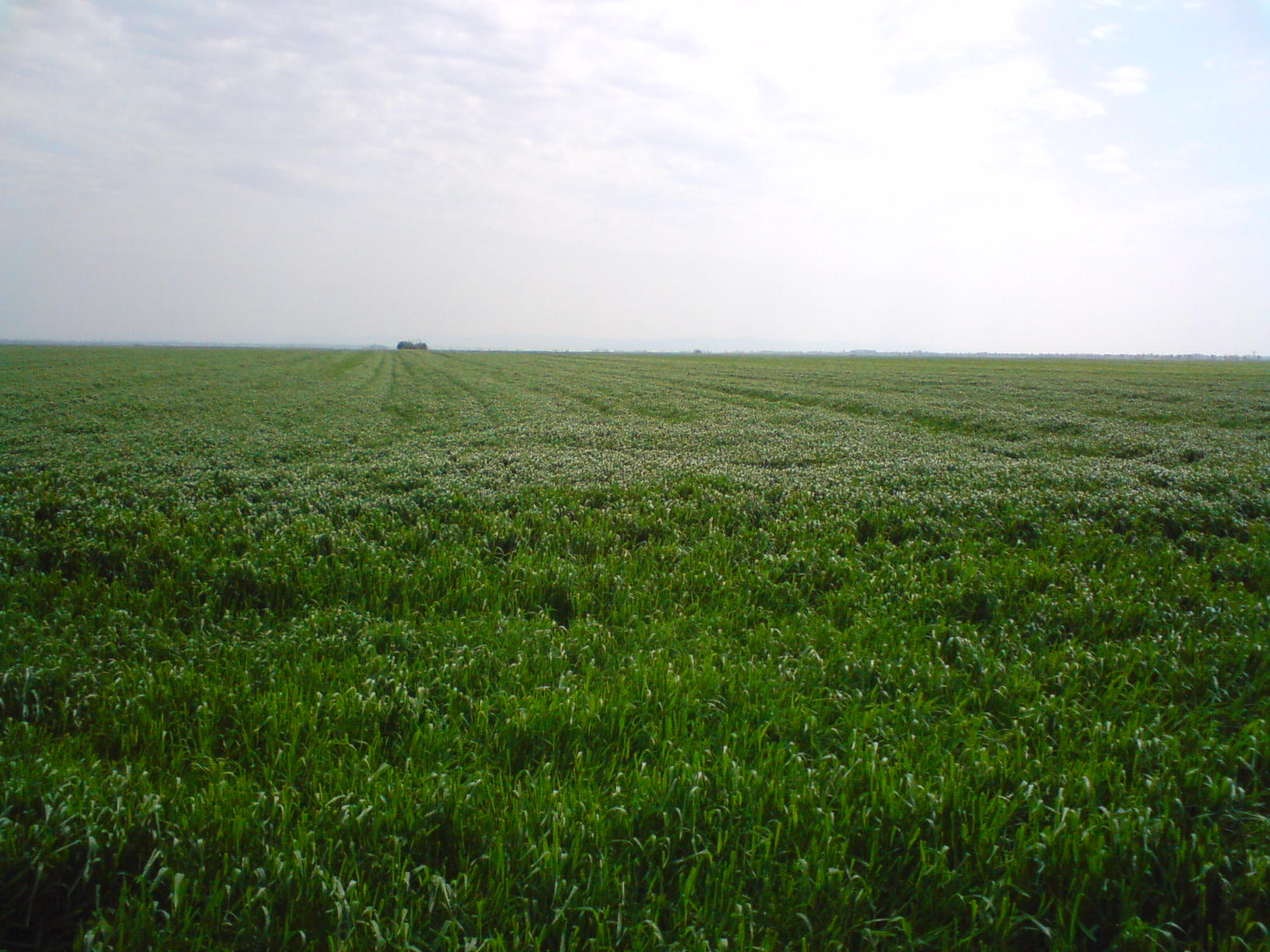
Young wheat field

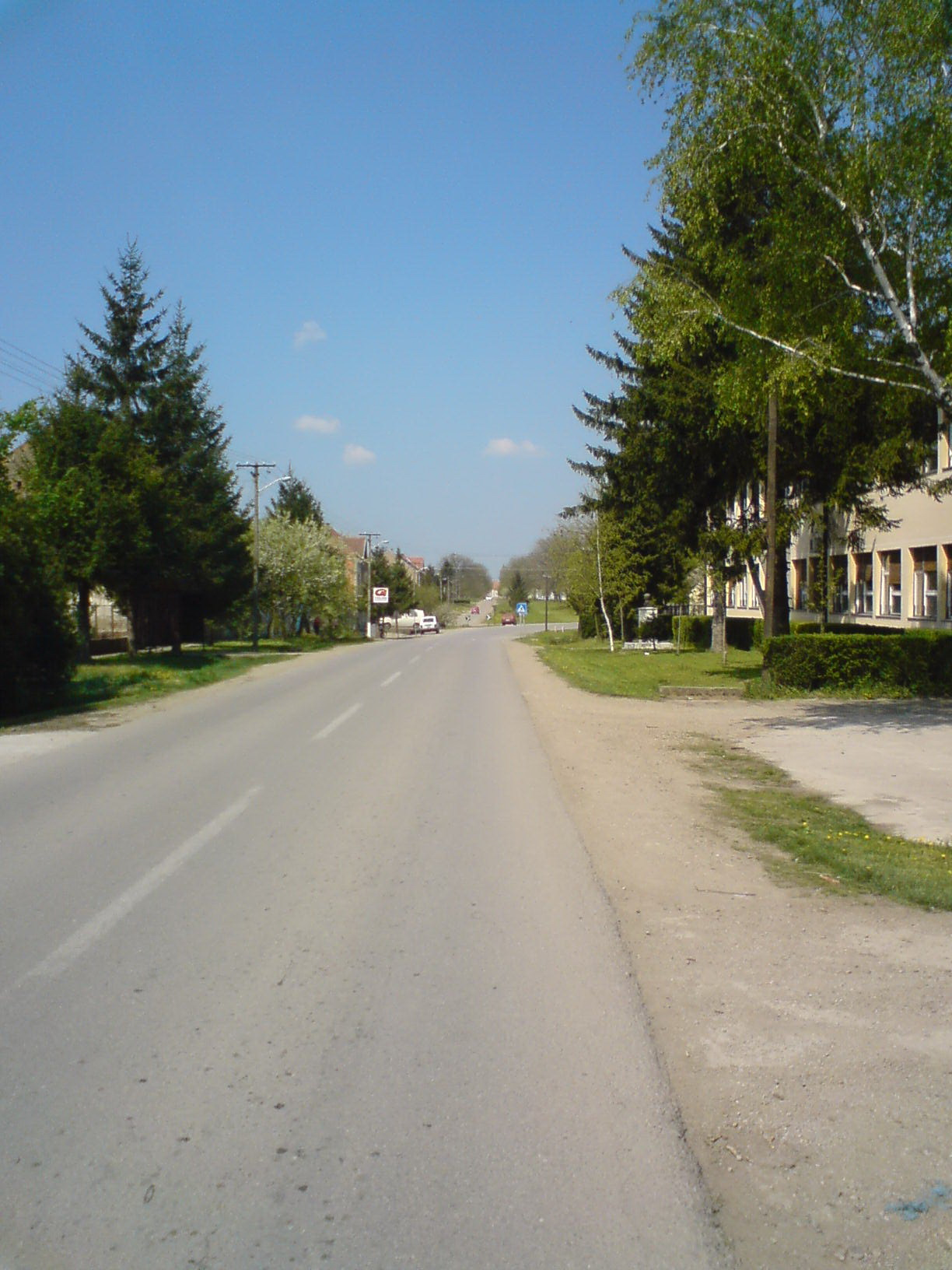
Izbište main street

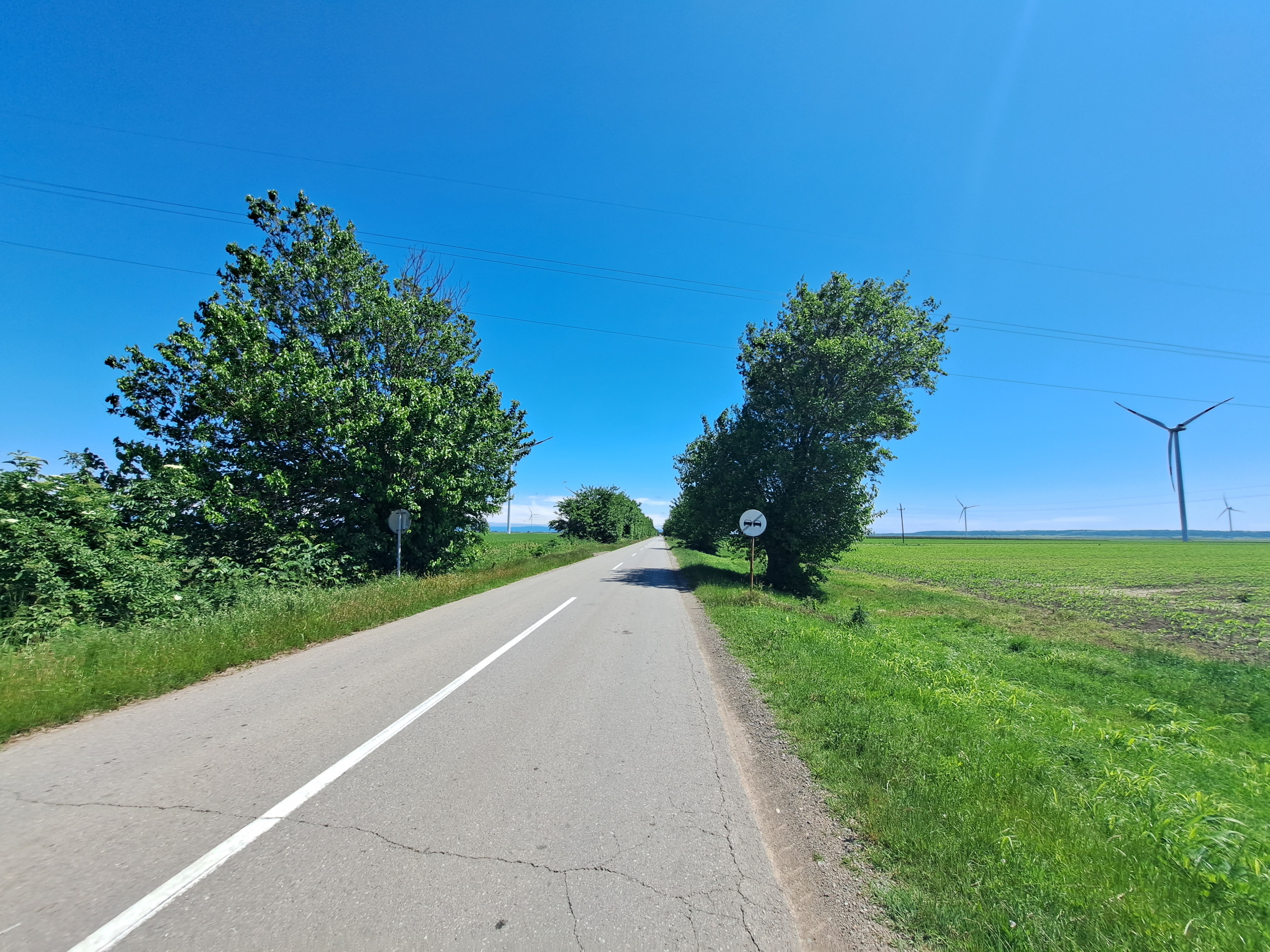
Road Zagajica - Izbište

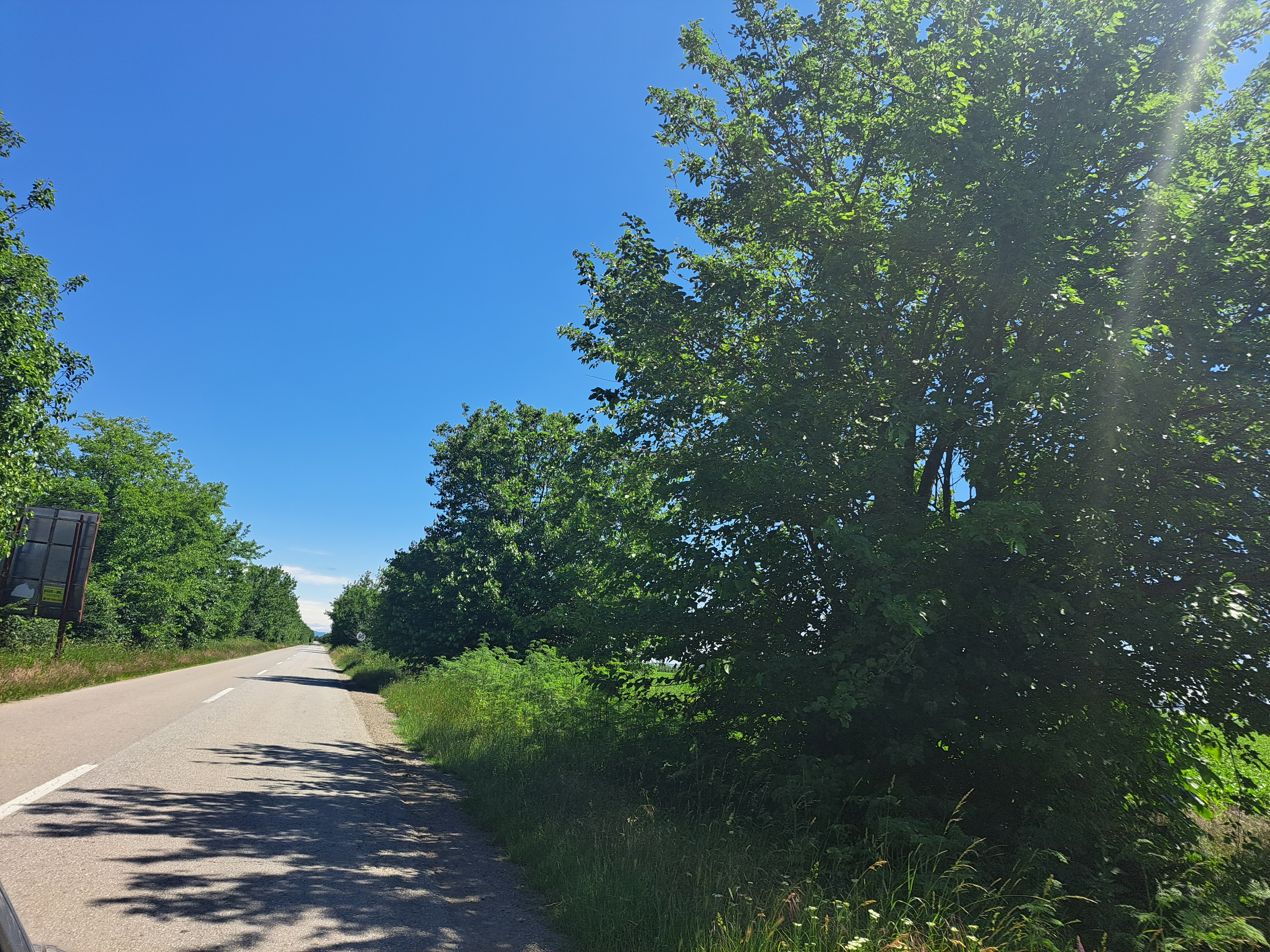
Road Zagajica - Izbište

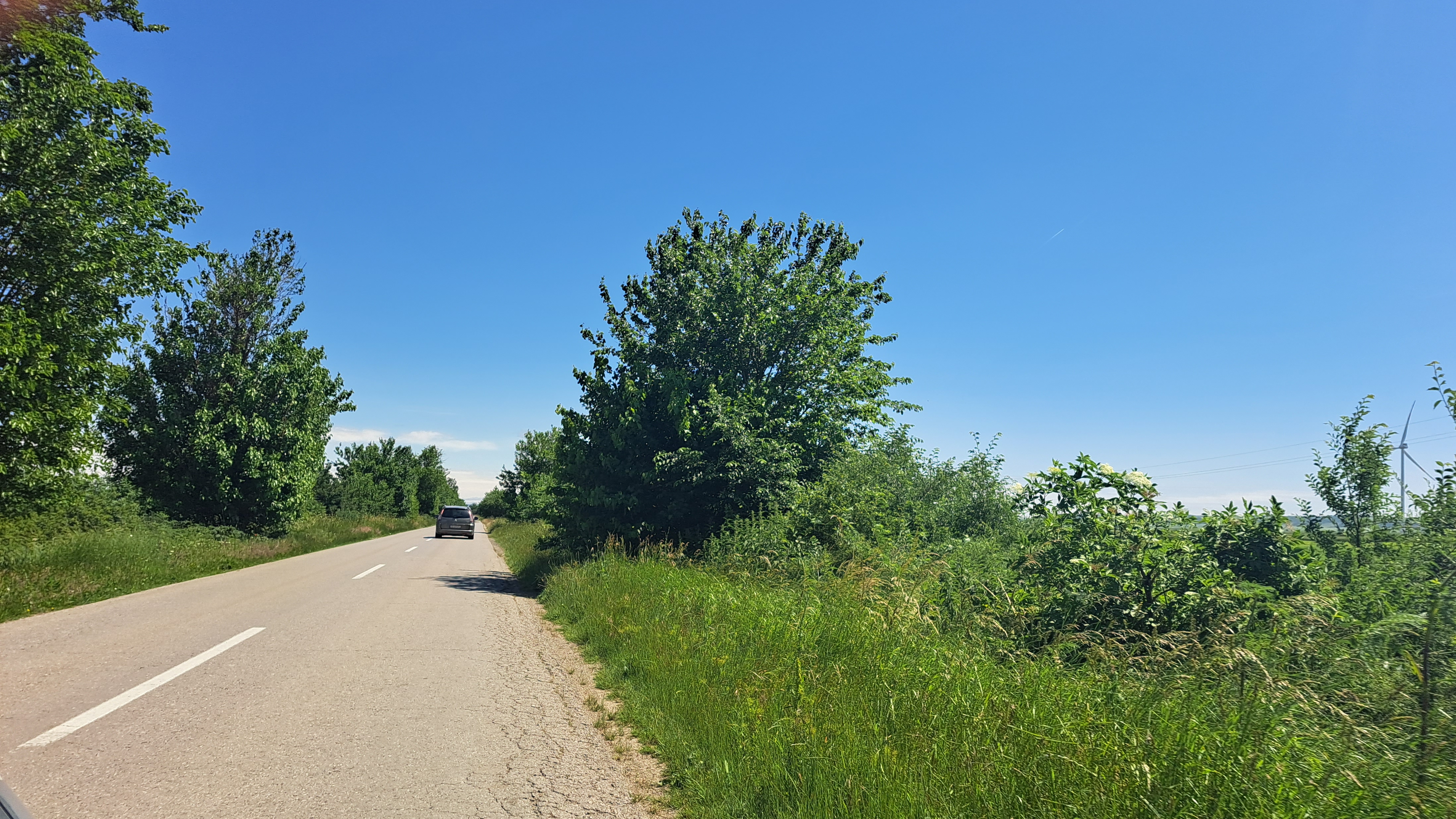
Road Zagajica - Izbište

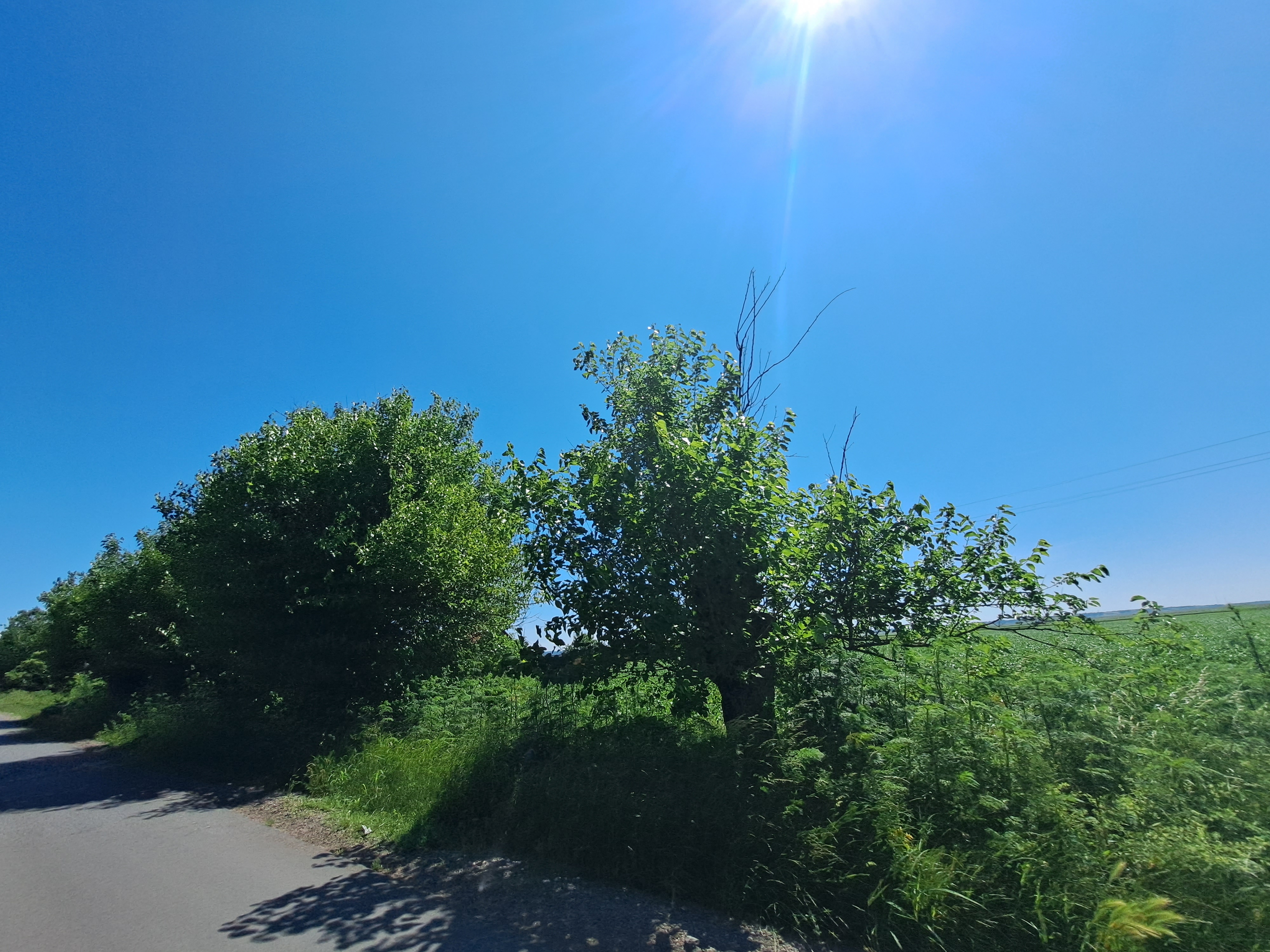
Road Izbište Uljma

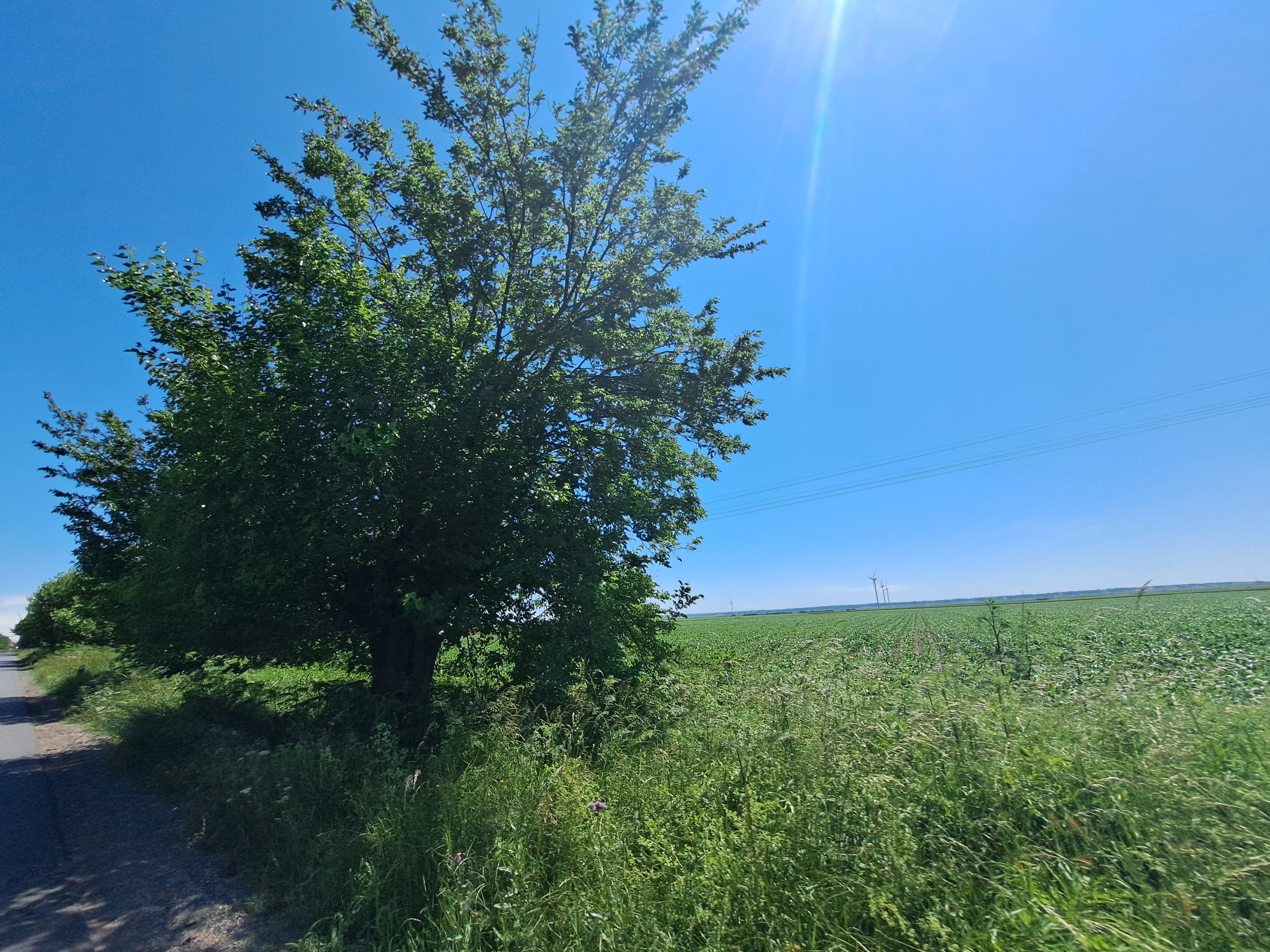
Road Izbište Uljma

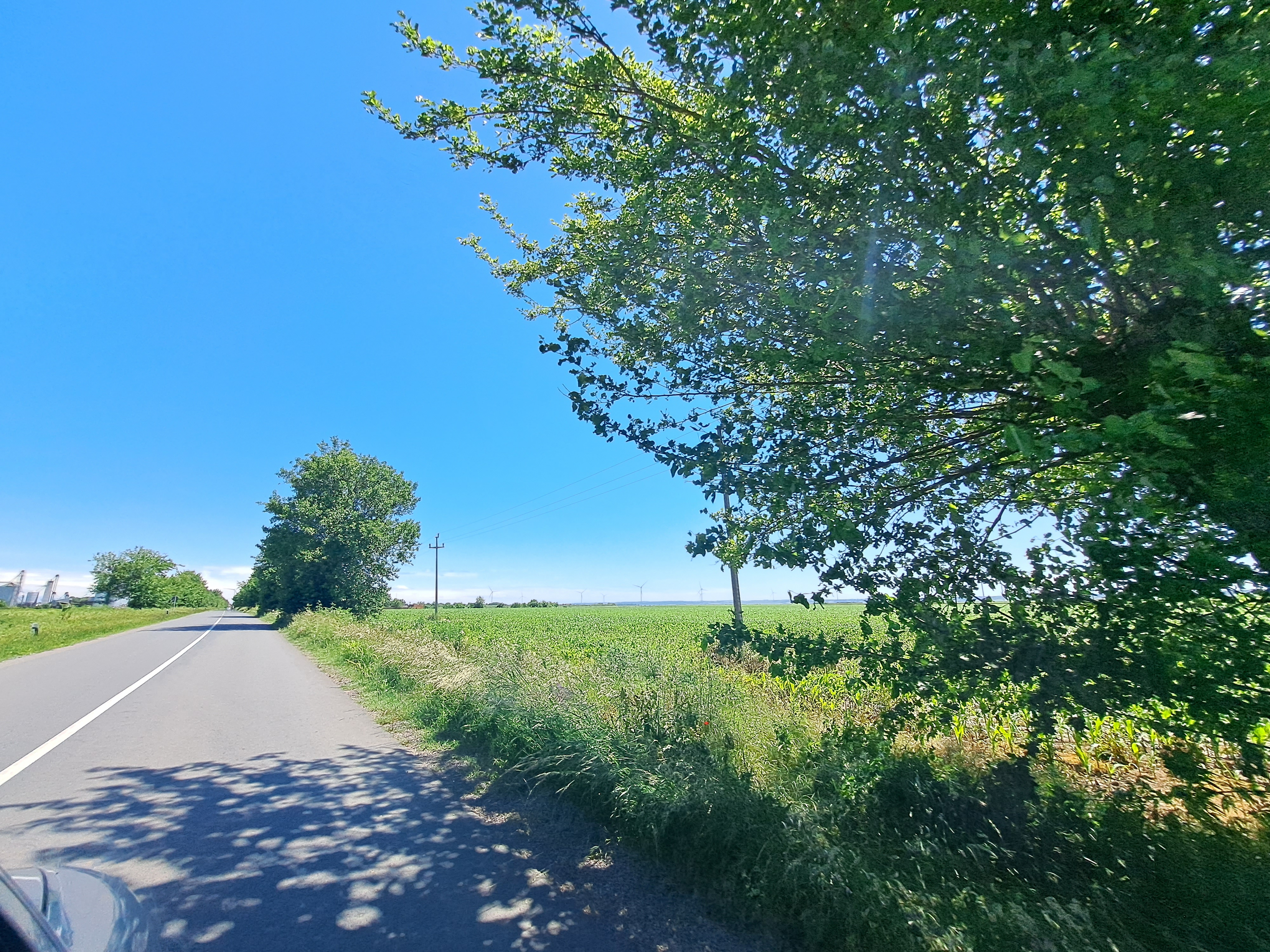
Road Izbište Uljma
