= Those Who Survive =

Novel by Kir Bulychov

Those Who Survive (Russian title: Посёлок, Posyolok, "The Settlement") is a science fiction novel of space robinsonade type by Russian writer Kir Bulychev. It is a story of a settlement of the survivors of a starship crash on an uninhabited planet, in two parts. The first part is the story of survival. The second part is about how another space expedition accidentally finds the survivors. It is part of Bulychev's Doctor Pavlysh series.

The first part was adapted into a 1988 Soviet animated short film The Pass in 1988.

== Plot ==
The story of the first part starts sixteen years after the crash landing of starship Pole in icy mountains of an unknown uninhabited planet, after which the survivors immediately abandoned the ship for fear of radiation and moved to a lower place. Several attempts to revisit the ship fail, and only the children of the crew reach the ship, with difficulties, and bring some supplies to the settlement. They also find communications equipment working, but they do not know how to use it.

The second part starts some three Earth years (one local year) after the events of the first part. The first generation clings to the Earth calendar, but the youth accept the local time count. One young man comes up with the idea of constructing an air balloon to make another trip to Pole. They rise above the clouds and notice an object that looks like an exploratory probe.

It turns out that another starship Magellan landed an expedition on the planet. They find the remnants of the ship, but decide that the whole crew perished. According to the regulations that forbid leaving traces of visitations, they decide to destroy Pole, but during the second inspection they conclude that some of the crew survived. After more adventures of both Pole and Magellan crews, a happy end follows.

== Publication history ==
The first part was serialized in the Znanie-Sila popular science magazine in 1980 under the title The Pass (Перевал). The second part, Beyond the Pass (За перевалом) was first published in an abridged form translated in Czech language as Země je příliš daleko serialized in the children's weekly magazine Sedmička pionýrů in 1986/1987. The complete novel was printed as a book in 1988. In 2000 it was published in English, translated by John H. Costello.

In German, the first part was published as Der Gebirgspass in 1986, the whole book was published as Überlebende in 1995. It took the 3rd place among the 1996 nominations for the Kurd Laßwitz Award in the category "Best foreign SF novel of 1995".
