= Half a Life (Bulychev) =

Science fiction novel by Kir Bulychev (1973)

Half a Life (Russian: Половина жизни) is a 1973 science fiction novel by Russian writer Kir Bulychev from his Doctor Pavlysh cycle. It tells the story of a Russian woman abducted by an alien spacecraft.

It was translated into English in 1977, as the first novel in the collection of Bulychev's stories titled Half a Life.

== Plot ==
An expedition discovered a derelict alien reconnaissance spaceship, which turned out to be fully automated and run by robots. Doctor Pavlysh, a member of the team, accidentally discovers scattered notes written in Russian. It turns out that these were the diary of a Soviet woman, Nadezhda Matveyevna Sidorova. In 1956, she was abducted by this spaceship, whose mission was to collect biological specimens all over the universe, and she has become a living exhibit on the spaceship. Her diary covers the long second half of her life, hence the title of the novel.

Nadezhda, the only human occupant, was able to communicate with other captured intelligent non-humanoid species, whom she calls "trepangs" due to their appearance. Together, they organize an escape from the vessel, but Nadezhda Sidorova tragically dies while distracting the guards, allowing the others to escape. Humans later learned that there is a monument to Nadezhda Sidorova at the native planet of the "trepangs", whose memry is cherished there.

== Other translations ==
Dutch: Halverwege Haar Leven (1979), Spanish: Media vida (1979), Polish: Połowa życia (1980), Bulgarian: Половин живот (1981), Hungarian: Kettészakított élet, (1983), Slovak: Polovica zivota (1984), Portuguese: Meia Vida (1986), Czech: Půl žívota (1986).
