= Biological half-life =

Time taken for a drug to halve its concentration in blood plasma

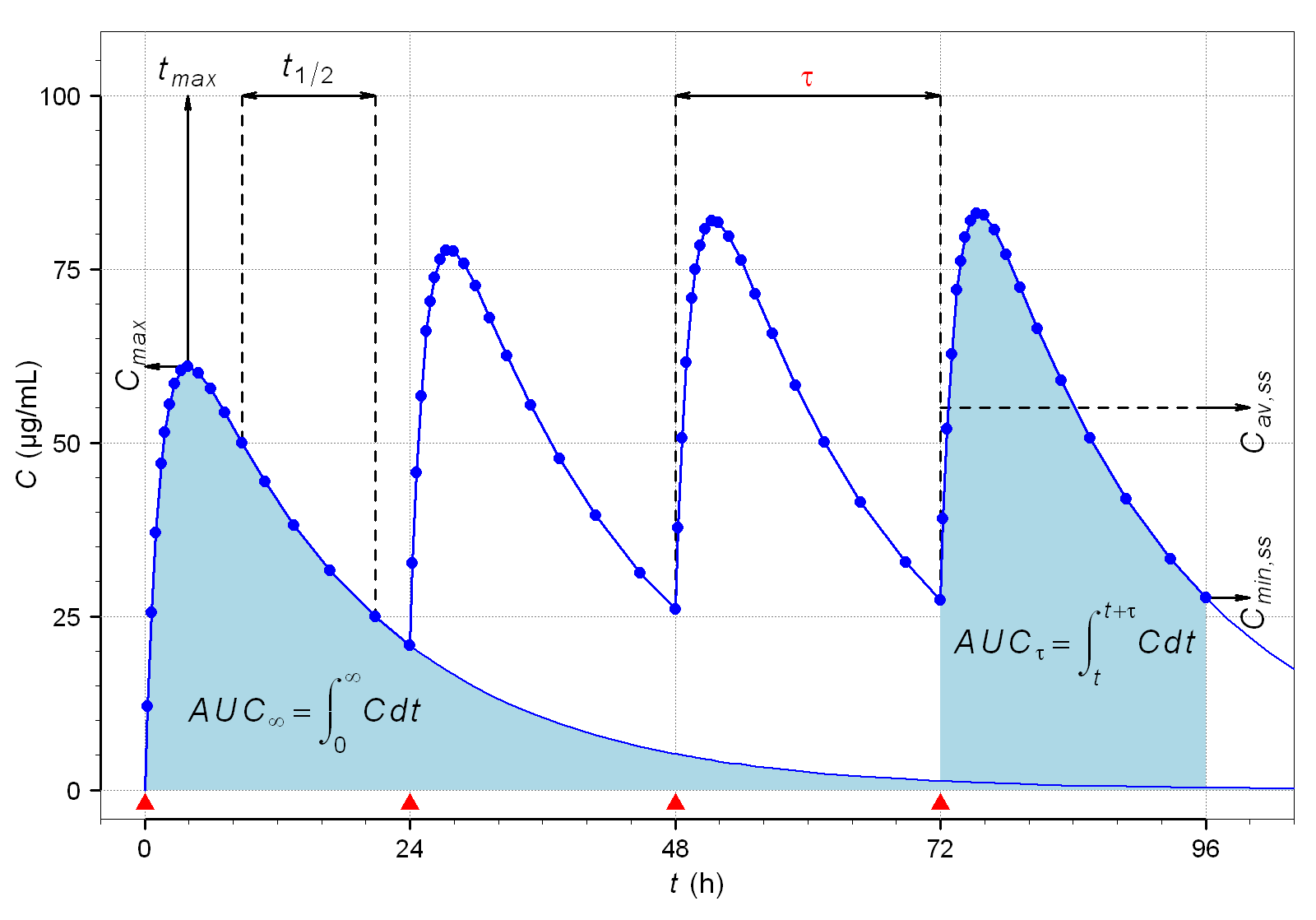
Time course of drug plasma concentrations over 96 hours following oral administrations every 24 hours (τ). Absorption half-life 1 h, elimination half-life 12 h.

Biological half-life (elimination half-life, pharmacological half-life) is the time taken for the concentration of a biological substance, such as a medication, to decrease from its maximum initial concentration (C_{max}) to the half of C_{max} in the blood plasma. It is denoted by the abbreviation $t_{\frac{1}{2}}$.

In multi-compartment pharmacokinetics, two operational half-lives are often distinguished: an early distribution (α) half-life governed by redistribution from the central to peripheral compartments, and a later elimination (β) half-life governed by metabolic clearance and excretion.

This is used to measure the removal of things such as metabolites, drugs, and signalling molecules from the body. Typically, the biological half-life refers to the body's natural cleansing, the detoxification through liver metabolism and through the excretion of the measured substance through the kidneys. This concept is used when the rate of removal is roughly exponential.

In a medical context, half-life explicitly describes the time it takes for the blood plasma concentration of a substance to halve (plasma half-life) its steady-state when circulating in the full blood of an organism. This measurement is useful in medicine, pharmacology and pharmacokinetics because it helps determine how much of a drug needs to be taken and how frequently it needs to be taken if a certain average amount is needed constantly. By contrast, the stability of a substance in plasma is described as plasma stability. This is essential to ensure accurate analysis of drugs in plasma and for drug discovery.

The relationship between the biological and plasma half-lives of a substance can be complex depending on the substance in question, due to factors including accumulation in tissues, protein binding, active metabolites, and receptor interactions.

== Examples ==
=== Water ===
The biological half-life of water in a human is about 7 to 14 days. It can be altered by behavior. Drinking large amounts of alcohol will reduce the biological half-life of water in the body. This has been used to decontaminate patients who are internally contaminated with tritiated water. The basis of this decontamination method is to increase the rate at which the water in the body is replaced with new water.

=== Alcohol ===
The removal of ethanol (drinking alcohol) through oxidation by alcohol dehydrogenase in the liver from the human body is limited. Hence the removal of a large concentration of alcohol from blood may follow zero-order kinetics. Also the rate-limiting steps for one substance may be in common with other substances. For instance, the blood alcohol concentration can be used to modify the biochemistry of methanol and ethylene glycol. In this way the oxidation of methanol to the toxic formaldehyde and formic acid in the human body can be prevented by giving an appropriate amount of ethanol to a person who has ingested methanol. Methanol is very toxic and causes blindness and death. A person who has ingested ethylene glycol can be treated in the same way. Half life is also relative to the subjective metabolic rate of the individual in question.

=== Common prescription medications ===
Substance	Biological half-life
Adenosine	Less than 10 seconds (estimate)
Norepinephrine	2 minutes
Oxaliplatin	14 minutes
Zaleplon	1 hour
Morphine	1.5–4.5 hours
Flurazepam	2.3 hours Active metabolite (N-desalkylflurazepam): 47–100 hours
Methotrexate	3–10 hours (lower doses), 8–15 hours (higher doses)
Methadone	15–72 hours in rare cases up to 8 days
Diazepam	20–50 hours Active metabolite (nordazepam): 30–200 hours
Phenytoin	20–60 hours
Buprenorphine	28–35 hours
Clonazepam	30–40 hours
Donepezil	3 days (70 hours)
Fluoxetine	4–6 days (under continuous administration) Active lipophilic metabolite (norfluoxetine): 4–16 days
Leflunomide	14–18 days
Amiodarone	14–107 days
Vandetanib	19 days
Dutasteride	21–35 days (under continuous administration)
Bedaquiline	165 days

=== Metals ===
The biological half-life of caesium in humans is between one and four months. This can be shortened by feeding the person prussian blue. The prussian blue in the digestive system acts as a solid ion exchanger which absorbs the caesium while releasing potassium ions.

For some substances, it is important to think of the human or animal body as being made up of several parts, each with its own affinity for the substance, and each part with a different biological half-life (physiologically-based pharmacokinetic modelling). Attempts to remove a substance from the whole organism may have the effect of increasing the burden present in one part of the organism. For instance, if a person who is contaminated with lead is given EDTA in a chelation therapy, then while the rate at which lead is lost from the body will be increased, the lead within the body tends to relocate into the brain where it can do the most harm.

- Polonium in the body has a biological half-life of about 30 to 50 days.
- Caesium in the body has a biological half-life of about one to four months.
- Mercury (as methylmercury) in the body has a half-life of about 65 days.
- Lead in the blood has a half-life of 28–36 days.
- Lead in bone has a biological half-life of about ten years.
- Cadmium in bone has a biological half-life of about 30 years.
- Plutonium in bone has a biological half-life of about 100 years.
- Plutonium in the liver has a biological half-life of about 40 years.

=== Peripheral half-life ===
Some substances may have different half-lives in different parts of the body. For example, oxytocin has a half-life of typically about three minutes in the blood when given intravenously. Peripherally administered (e.g. intravenous) peptides like oxytocin cross the blood-brain-barrier very poorly, although very small amounts (< 1%) do appear to enter the central nervous system in humans when given via this route. In contrast to peripheral administration, when administered intranasally via a nasal spray, oxytocin reliably crosses the blood–brain barrier and exhibits psychoactive effects in humans. In addition, unlike the case of peripheral administration, intranasal oxytocin has a central duration of at least 2.25 hours and as long as 4 hours. In likely relation to this fact, endogenous oxytocin concentrations in the brain have been found to be as much as 1000-fold higher than peripheral levels.

== Rate equations ==
=== First-order elimination ===
Timeline of an exponential decay process
Time (t)	Percent of initial value	Percent completion
t1/2	50%	50%
t1/2 × 2	25%	75%
t1/2 × 3	12.5%	87.5%
t1/2 × 3.322	10.00%	90.00%
t1/2 × 4	6.25%	93.75%
t1/2 × 4.322	5.00%	95.00%
t1/2 × 5	3.125%	96.875%
t1/2 × 6	1.5625%	98.4375%
t1/2 × 7	0.78125%	99.21875%
t1/2 × 10	~0.09766%	~99.90234%

Half-times apply to processes where the elimination rate is exponential. If $C(t)$ is the concentration of a substance at time $t$, its time dependence is given by

$$C(t) = C(0) e^{-kt} \,$$

where k is the reaction rate constant. Such a decay rate arises from a first-order reaction where the rate of elimination is proportional to the amount of the substance:

$$\frac{d C}{d t} = -k C.$$

The half-life for this process is

$$t_\frac{1}{2} = \frac{\ln 2}{k}. \,$$

Alternatively, half-life is given by

$$t_\frac{1}{2} = \frac{\ln 2}{\lambda _{z}} \,$$

where λ_{z} is the slope of the terminal phase of the time–concentration curve for the substance on a semilogarithmic scale.

Half-life is determined by clearance (CL) and volume of distribution (V_{D}) and the relationship is described by the following equation:

$$t_\frac{1}{2} = \frac{{\ln 2}\cdot{V_D}}{CL} \,$$

In clinical practice, this means that it takes 4 to 5 times the half-life for a drug's serum concentration to reach steady state after regular dosing is started, stopped, or the dose changed. So, for example, digoxin has a half-life (or t_{1/2}) of 24–36 h; this means that a change in the dose will take the best part of a week to take full effect. For this reason, drugs with a long half-life (e.g., amiodarone, elimination t_{1/2} of about 58 days) are usually started with a loading dose to achieve their desired clinical effect more quickly.

=== Biphasic half-life ===
Many drugs show a biphasic decline in plasma concentration after a dose: a steep distribution phase as drug leaves the central compartment for tissues (α phase), followed by a shallower elimination phase as drug is cleared (β phase). On a semi-log plot the two phases are approximately linear, with slopes α and β, and corresponding half-lives t_{1/2α} = 0.693/α and t_{1/2β} = 0.693/β.

For single doses of lipophilic, multi-compartment drugs, clinical duration after onset is often driven by the distribution (α) phase, because by the time distribution equilibrium is reached plasma levels are frequently below any minimal effective concentration, so the terminal β phase has little bearing on observable effects. As a result, classifying drugs by terminal (β) half-life can poorly predict duration of action, whereas α half-life is often more informative—though less commonly reported in labels and reviews.

Exceptions exist when elimination is extremely rapid: for very short-acting agents, the β phase can meaningfully shorten effect duration even after a single dose (e.g., triazolam, midazolam).

The longer half-life is called the terminal half-life and the half-life of the largest component is called the dominant half-life. For a more detailed description see Pharmacokinetics § Multi-compartmental models.

== See also ==
- Half-life, pertaining to the general mathematical concept in physics or pharmacology.
- Effective half-life
