= Lyudi kak lyudi =

Collection of science fiction short stories

Half a Life
- First edition (Russian)
- Author: Kir Bulychev
- Original title: Люди как люди
- Language: Russian
- Genre: Science fiction
- Publisher: Molodaya Gvardiya (Russia); Macmillan Publishing
- Publication date: 1975
- English publication date: 1977
- Media type: Print
- ISBN: 0-02-017850-6

Lyudi kak lyudi (Russian: Люди как люди, literally, "People like people") (Note: The expression "Люди как люди" usually means "ordinary, normal people". Most commonly it is used in two different contexts: "people, nothing special about them" and as a form of chastising: "all people are like people, but you are <some kind of accusation>.") is a 1975 collection of 11 science fiction short stories plus one novel by Russian novelist Kir Bulychev. In 1977, a part of it (6 stories) plus one other story was translated into English as Half a Life with an introduction by Theodore Sturgeon). In 1979, 6 stories from it plus one other story were also translated in Dutch as Mag ik Nina even?. The 1979 Spanish translation is Media vida en el espacio. In 1983 it was translated in Hungarian as Kettészakított élet. In 1992 it was republished as part of a larger anthology that included stories of other authors, including 6 short stories by Viktor Kolupaev.

== Stories ==
The longest of the stories, it fact, a novel, called Half a Life (Половина жизни, 1973), tells the story of a Russian woman kidnapped by an alien spacecraft in the years following the second world war. In a distant, but unspecified future, human cosmonauts discover the alien ship floating in space, a derelict. Entering the ship, they soon realize that it was automated - run by robots with the apparent mission of collecting biologic specimens from different planets. (The purpose of this exploration remains undetermined, but one of the humans speculate that it may have been a lucky break for mankind that the ship never returned home.) One of the cosmonauts finds bits of a journal written in Russian, a diary of life aboard the spacecraft written by the abducted Russian woman, the ship's sole human occupant. Compiling the journal from bits ad pieces, the cosmonauts learn of the human author's attempts to bond with the ship's other intelligent specimens, and of their plot to escape the ship's crew of automatons. When the cosmonauts find the journal incomplete, they are forced to learn for themselves the fate of the author.

In I Was the First to Find You (Я вас первым обнаружил!, 1970; not in the Russian collection), the crew of the Earth ship Spartak have spent years on a deep space expedition only to find that another starship started 100 years ago, took two months to reach the same destination, and depart back to the Earth 15 years ago. As Spartak flew at interstellar speeds, the gap of time between her departure and return was even greater on Earth, and her crew are pondering whether they have wasted their lives away. The title of the novel is the punch line from an episode on their way back: it turned out that other ships were constantly searching the space for the returning Spartak, and the commander of the lucky patrol ship happily uttered: "Damn, I was the first one to find you!"

In Protest (Протест, 1975), a famous former athlete is forced to mediate a dispute in an interplanetary Olympics competition, where the aliens were using "superpowers" not available for humans.

In Red Deer, White Deer (Красный олень — белый олень, 1973), human explorers discover a world having reached a state comparable to Earth's at the dawn of mankind. Fate however, has this world taking a different path.

In May I Please Speak to Nina (Можно попросить Нину?, 1973), the narrator has been trying to reach his girlfriend Nina by phone. Instead, he keeps reaching another Nina, one who thinks that she is in the 1940s, as the Soviet Union is besieged by war. For the narrator, it is the 1970s. Perhaps the girl is playing a trick, or is actually a demented old woman for whom time has lost its meaning. The narrator, with his own bitter memories of that time, cannot discard the possibility that his phone has somehow crossed wires through time.

In Snowmaiden (Снегурочка 1973), human cosmonauts discover the beautiful survivor of a destroyed spaceship from another world. Despite incompatible physiologies, love blooms between the alien "snowmaiden" and one of her rescuers.

The First Layer of Memory (Первый слой памяти, 1974): A cave in Russian mountains has collapsed, trapping speleologists. Only one man from the team was found miles away from the cave. He managed to escape because he knew another way out in his youth. However this man is unconscious, and through the transplantation of his memory, a rescuer must find the other way to the cave.

The Russian collection also includes the short stories:

- Трудный ребёнок (1975, translated in 1983 as A Difficult Child)
- Сказка о репе [= Сказка про репку] (1974, translated in 1983 as Tale of the Turnip)
- Терпение и труд (1975)
- Если бы не Михаил... (1975, translated in 1983 as If It Hadn't Been for Mikhail)
- Корона профессора Козарина (1973, translated in 1983 as Professor Kozarin's Crown)
- О некрасивом биоформе (1974, translated in 1981 as An Ugly Bioform)
