= Effective half-life =

Time for all bodily mechanisms to halve a drug's concentration in the bloodstream

In pharmacokinetics, the effective half-life is the rate of accumulation or elimination of a biochemical or pharmacological substance in an organism; it is the analogue of biological half-life when the kinetics are governed by multiple independent mechanisms. This is seen when there are multiple mechanisms of elimination, or when a drug occupies multiple pharmacological compartments. It reflects the cumulative effect of the individual half-lives, as observed by the changes in the actual serum concentration of a drug under a given dosing regimen. The complexity of biological systems means that most pharmacological substances do not have a single mechanism of elimination, and hence the observed or effective half-life does not reflect that of a single process, but rather the summation of multiple independent processes.

== Radionuclides ==
When radionuclides are used pharmacologically, for example in radiation therapy, they are eliminated through a combination of radioactive decay and biological excretion. An effective half-life of the drug will involve a decay constant that represents the sum of the biological and physical decay constants, as in the formula:

$${\lambda_e} \, = {\lambda_p} \, + {\lambda_b} \,$$

With the decay constant it is possible to calculate the effective half-life using the formula:

$$t_{1/2} = \frac{\ln (2)}{\lambda_e}$$

The biological decay constant is often approximated as it is more difficult to accurately determine than the physical decay constant.

Alternatively, since the radioactive decay contributes to the "physical (i.e. radioactive)" half-life, while the metabolic elimination processes determines the "biological" half-life of the radionuclide, the two act as parallel paths for elimination of the radioactivity, the effective half-life could also be represented by the formula:

$\frac{1}{t_{1/2e}} = \frac{1}{t_{1/2p}} + \frac{1}{t_{1/2b}}$ ,
or
$t_{1/2e} = \frac{t_{1/2p}\cdot t_{1/2b}} {t_{1/2p} + t_{1/2b}}$.
