= Aleksander Spivakovsky =

Ukrainian academic administrator

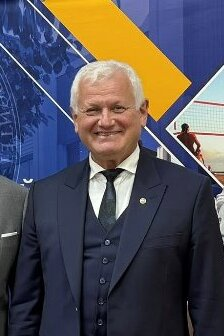
Spivakovsky in 2025

Aleksander Spivakovsky (Ukrainian: Олександр Співаковський, romanized: Oleksandr Spivakovskyi) is a Ukrainian academic administrator and mathematician. He is the rector of Kherson State University and a professor and chair of informatics, software engineering, and economic cybernetics. On October 21, 2016, Spivakovsky was elected an academician and corresponding member of the National Academy of Educational Sciences of Ukraine.
