= The Tale of the Dead Princess and the Seven Knights =

1833 fairy tale poem by Pushkin

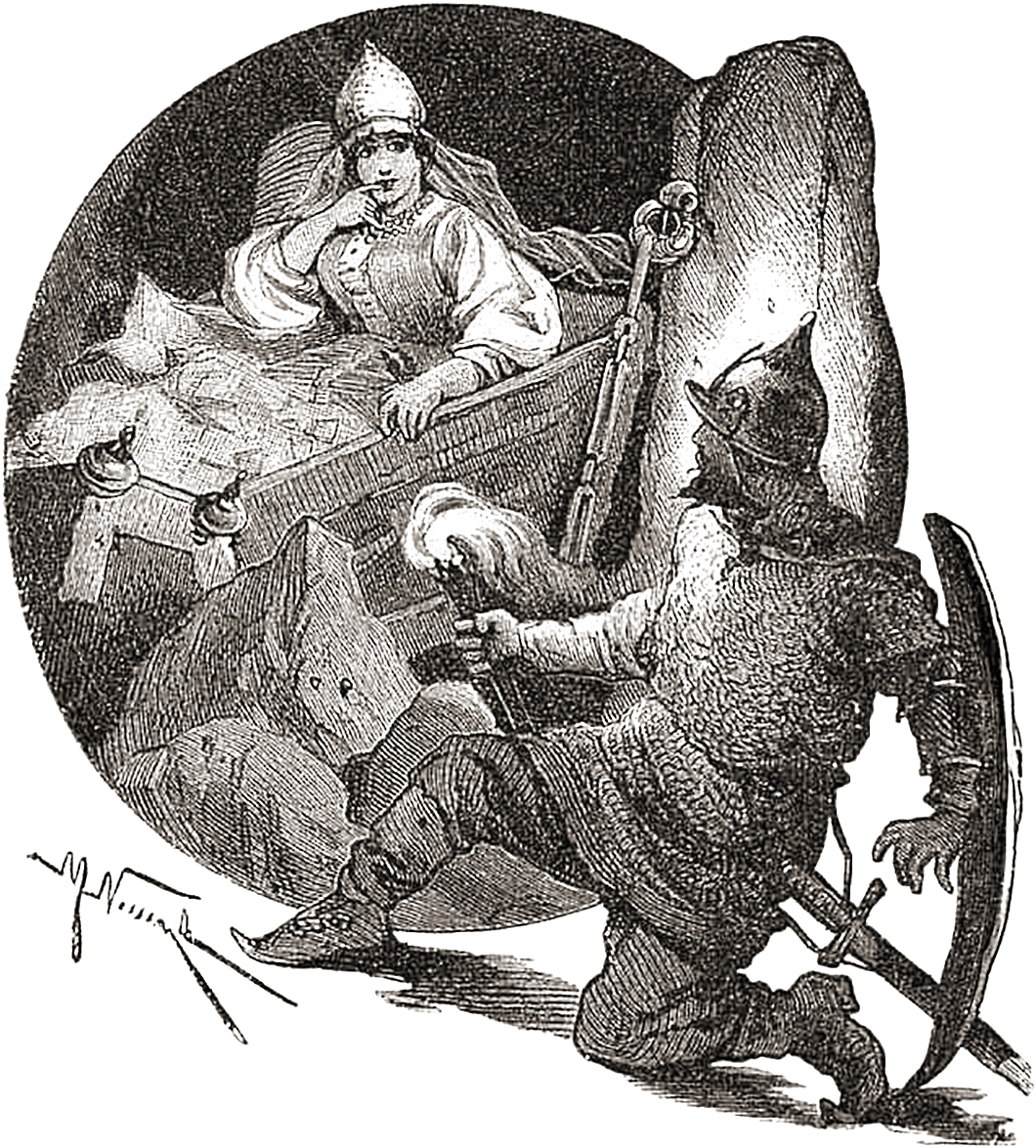
Mikhail Nesterov. The Tale of the Dead Princess and the Seven Knights. 1889

The Tale of the Dead Princess and the Seven Knights (Russian: «Сказка о мёртвой царевне и о семи богатырях», romanized: Skazka o myortvoy tsarevne i o semi bogatyryakh, literally: "The Tale of the Dead Tsarevna and of the Seven Bogatyrs") is an 1833 poem by Aleksandr Pushkin telling a fairy tale of Prince Yelisei's search for his love, the Tsarevna (princess), who has been cast out by her stepmother.

== Origin ==
While the story resembles the Little Snow White tale from the Grimm's Fairy Tales, it is based around national Russian folklore, like Pushkin's other fairy tales in verse inspired by the childhood tales told by his nurse Arina Rodionovna at the Mikhaylovskoye village.

Similar stories could be found in the Russian Fairy Tales collection by Alexander Afanasyev (tales No. 210 and 211), Great Russian Fairy Tales collection (1861) by Ivan Khudyakov (tale No. 45), Fables and Legends of the Samara Region (1884) by Dmitry Sadovnikov (tale No. 14) and Great Russian Fairy Tales of the Vyatka Governorate (1915) by Dmitry Zelenin (tale No. 52).

Researchers find a lot of symbolism in the Puskin's version of the fairy tale with roots in both Slavic mythology and Christianity.

== Plot summary ==
A tsar goes on a voyage and leaves his beautiful tsarina behind. She spends days and nights waiting for him by the window, and in nine months gives birth to their daughter. Next morning her husband returns, and she dies from happiness and exhaustion the same day. In a year the tsar marries another woman — not only smart and beautiful, but also arrogant and jealous. She has a magic mirror in her possession that talks back to the tsarina, complimenting her beauty.

As the time passes by, the young tsarevna grows up and gets engaged to the prince Yelisei. The night before the wedding the tsarina asks her magic mirror whether she is still the sweetest and prettiest of them all, but the mirror points at the tsarevna which drives the woman mad. She orders the servant girl Chernavka to take her stepdaughter into the heart of the forest, tie her down and leave her to the wolves. Chernavka follows the orders, but as they go deep into the forest, the tsarevna starts begging Chernavka to spare her life. Chernavka, who sympathizes with the girl, leaves her untied and lies to the mistress on return. Soon the news of the missing bride reaches the prince who immediately goes on a quest to find her.

Meanwhile, the tsarevna wanders through the forest and stumbles across a terem guarded by a dog which she immediately befriends. She enters the hut, but doesn't find anyone inside, so she cleans everything up and goes to sleep. After a while seven bogatyrs arrive for a dinner. They kindly greet and feed the girl, calling her their sister, and from the way she talks deduce that she must be a tsarevna. The tsarevna stays with her newly found brothers, looking after the house while they hunt in the forest or fight foreign invaders.

After some time the evil tsarina discovers that her stepdaughter is still alive with the help of the magic mirror. She orders Chernavka to get rid of the tsarevna under pain of death. The servant girl dresses as a nun and travels to the house of the seven bogatyrs. She is met by the barking dog who refuses to let her approach, but the tsarevna throws her some bread anyway. In return the nun throws her an apple and disappears. As soon as the tsarevna bites the apple, she gets poisoned and dies. The dog leads the bogatyrs to her, bites the poisoned apple in anger and also dies, revealing the cause of the tragedy. They put the girl into a crystal coffin and bring her to a cave. The same day, the tsarina learns of her death.

Meanwhile, the prince Yelisei rides around the world, asking everyone whether they saw his lost bride. At the end he decides to ask the Sun, which aids him to the Moon. He then asks the Moon, which aids him to the wind. As he asks the wind, it tells him about the cave with the crystal coffin where his bride lies. Yelisei finds the cave and hits the coffin with all his strength, causing it to break into pieces and his bride to come alive. They ride to the palace and meet the tsarina who is already aware of the wonderful resurrection of her stepdaughter. But as she sees the tsarevna, she falls dead in agony. Right after her burial the couple gets married in a grand ceremony.

There also exists Pushkin's own outline of the story which he planned to write, but which does not much resemble the version he ultimately published.

== Adaptations ==
- 1951 — The Tale of the Dead Princess, USSR, traditionally animated film directed by Ivan Ivanov-Vano.
- 1978 — Autumn Bells, USSR, feature film directed by Vladimir Gorikker.
- 1990 — The Tale of the Dead Princess and the Seven Knights opera written by Viktor Vasilievich Pleshak and performed at the Theater of Opera and Ballet of the Saint Petersburg Conservatory.
- 2011 — "Nina Govedarica", Australia, Life Story.

== English translations ==
- Pushkin, Alexander (1974). The Tale of the Dead Princess and the Seven Knights. Translated by Peter Tempest. Moscow: Raduga Publishers. (available at marxists.org)
