= Pavliš =

Pavliš Павлиш
- Village (Selo)
- Location of Pavliš within Serbia Pavliš (Serbia) Pavliš (Europe)
- Coordinates: 45°06′06″N 21°14′16″E
- Country: Serbia
- Province: Vojvodina
- District: South Banat
- Municipality: Vršac
- Elevation: 90 m (300 ft)

Population (2011)
  - Pavliš: 2,205
- Time zone: UTC+1 (CET)
  - Summer (DST): UTC+2 (CEST)
- Postal code: 26333
- Area code: +381(0)13
- Car plates: VŠ

Pavliš (Serbian Cyrillic: Павлиш; Hungarian: Temespaulis) is a village in Serbia. It is situated in the Vršac municipality, South Banat District, Vojvodina province. The village has a Serb ethnic majority (87.52%) and its population numbering 2,205 people (2011 census).

== Name ==
In Serbian the village is known as Pavliš (Павлиш), in Romanian as Păuliș, in Hungarian as Temespaulis, and in German as Temesch Paulisch.

== Historical population ==
- 1961: 2,246
- 1971: 2,188
- 1981: 2,137
- 1991: 1,999
- 2002: 2,237
- 2002: 2,205

== See also ==
- List of places in Serbia
- List of cities, towns and villages in Vojvodina
