= Hermann Bollé =

Austro-Hungarian architect who practiced in Croatia, as well as in Serbia

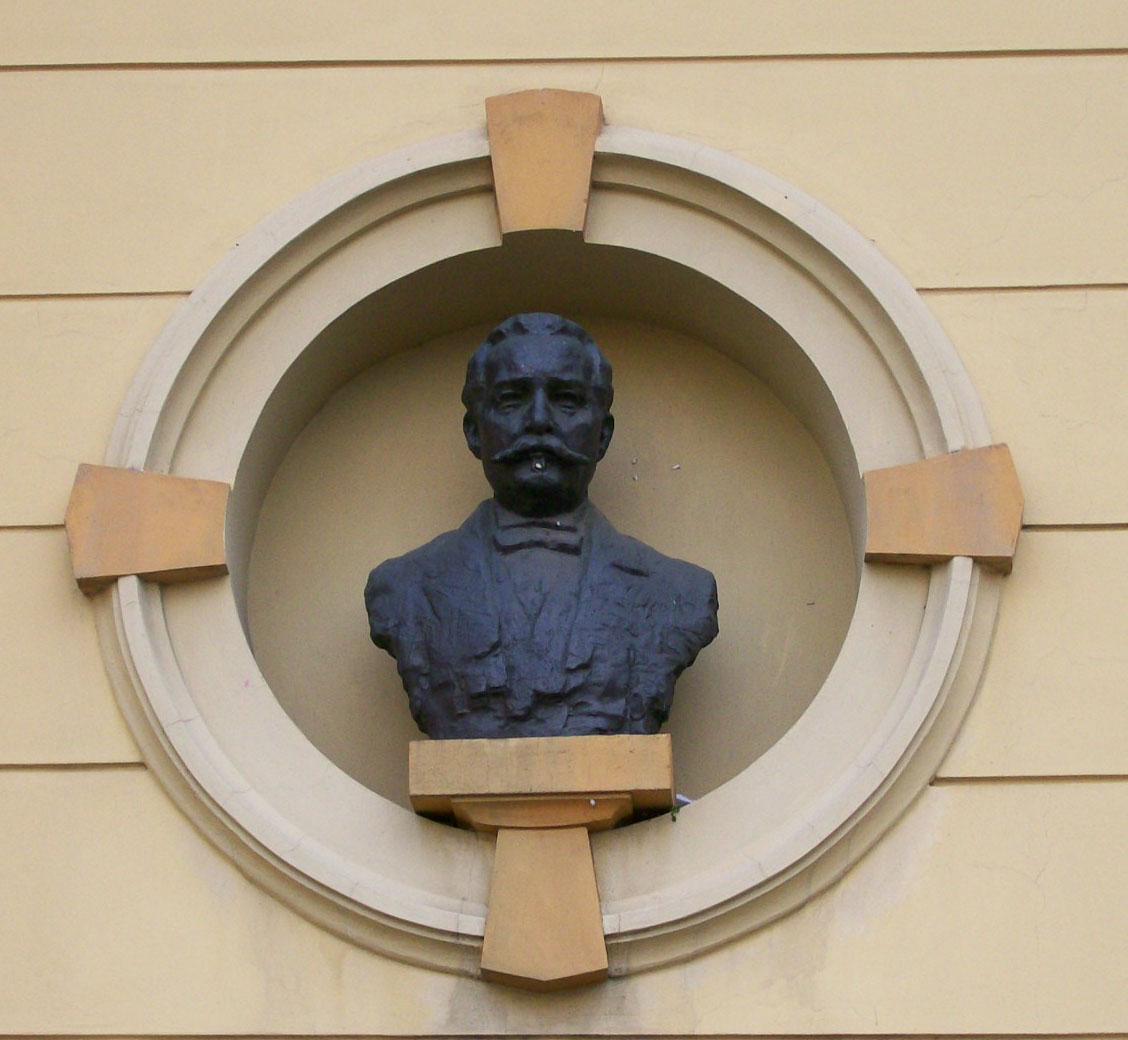
Bust of Bollé in Republic of Croatia Square

Hermann Bollé (18 September 1845 – 17 April 1926) was an Austro-Hungarian architect of Franco-German origin who practiced in Croatia (Zagreb and Slavonia), as well as in Serbia.

== Life ==
He was born in Cologne. After attending a vocational school where he studied civil engineering, he worked in the architectural studios of Heinrich Wiethase, where he was involved in projects for churches and other religious buildings. Beginning in 1872, he studied at the Academy of Fine Arts Vienna while working in the offices of well-known cathedral architect Friedrich von Schmidt.

During 1875–76, he lived in Italy where he met Bishop Josip Juraj Strossmayer and the painter Izidor Kršnjavi. This meeting led him to consider Croatia as a place to establish his practice.

In 1876, he went to Đakovo, where he joined Friedrich von Schmidt to complete construction of the Cathedral of St.Peter and St.Paul, begun by architect Carl Roesner, who had died in 1869. That same year, he completed the restoration of St.Mark's Church in Zagreb, where he settled permanently in 1878.

He restored and built many structures in a variety of styles, including the Museum of Arts and Crafts, the Zagreb Cathedral, the Mirogoj Cemetery and the Greek Catholic Cathedral of the Holy Trinity in Križevci. He eventually gained great influence over the general city planning process and layout of Zagreb. He died on 17 April 1926 in Zagreb.

== Best-known projects ==
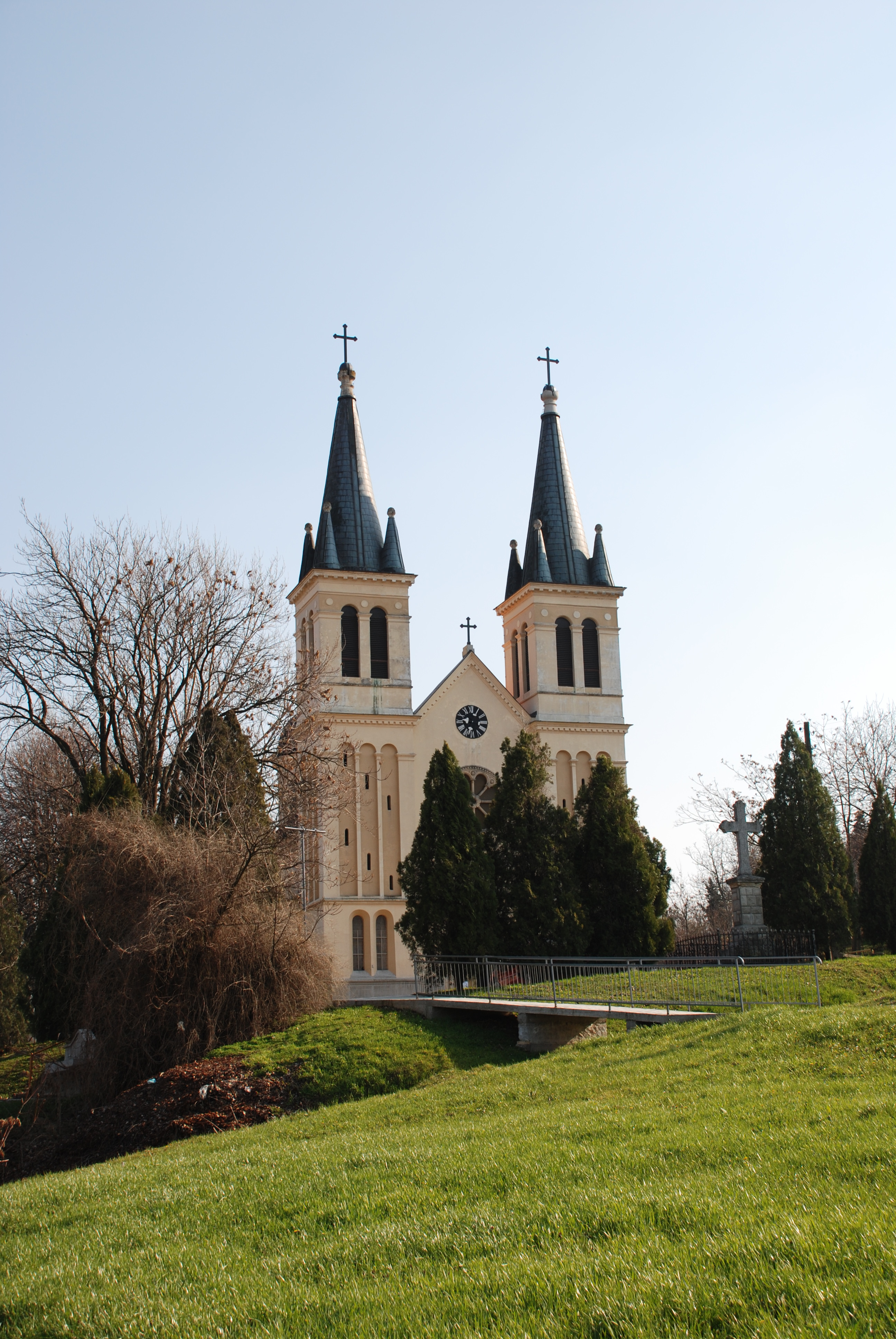
The Our Lady of Snow Ecumenic Church

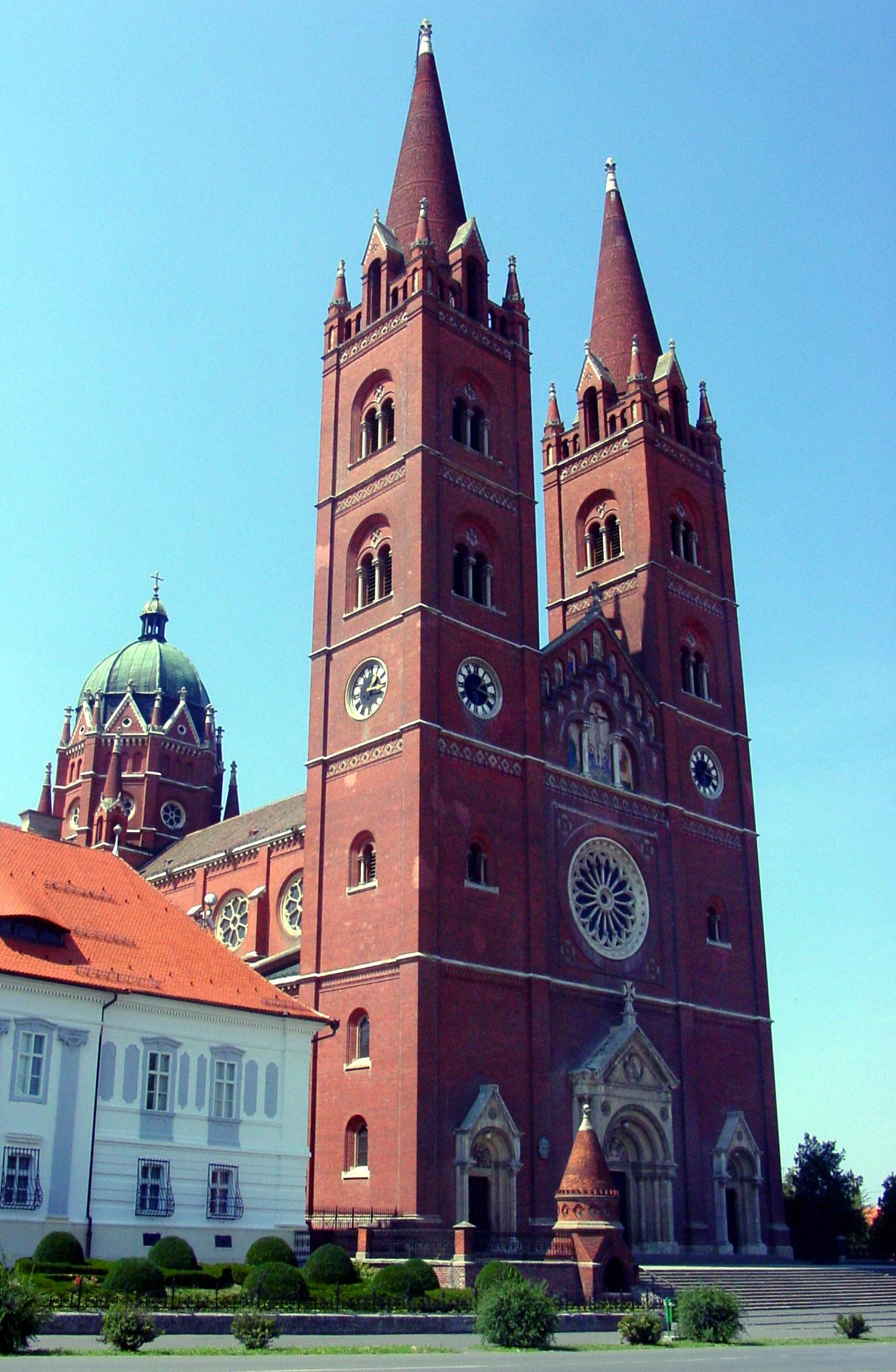
Đakovo Cathedral

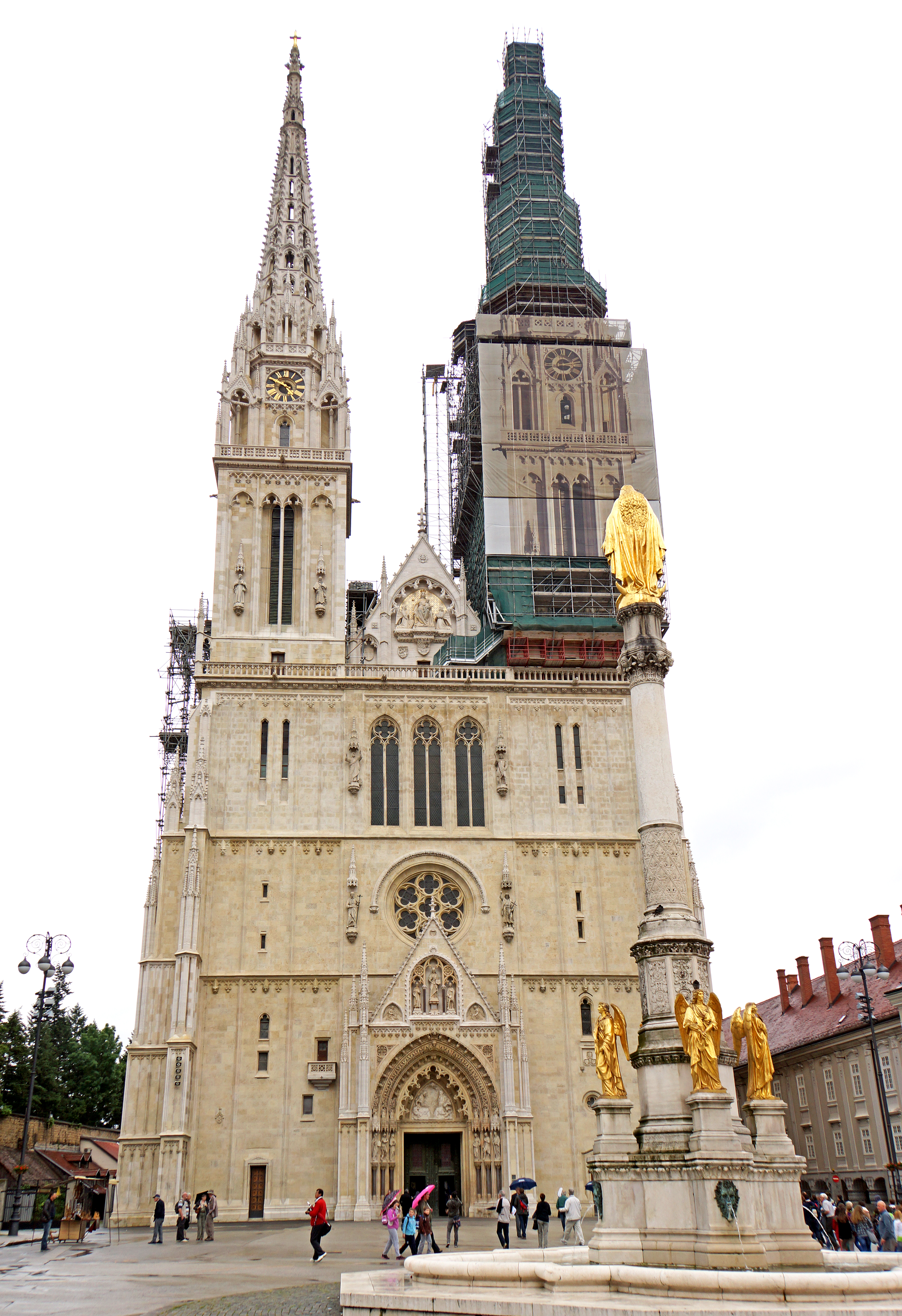
Zagreb Cathedral

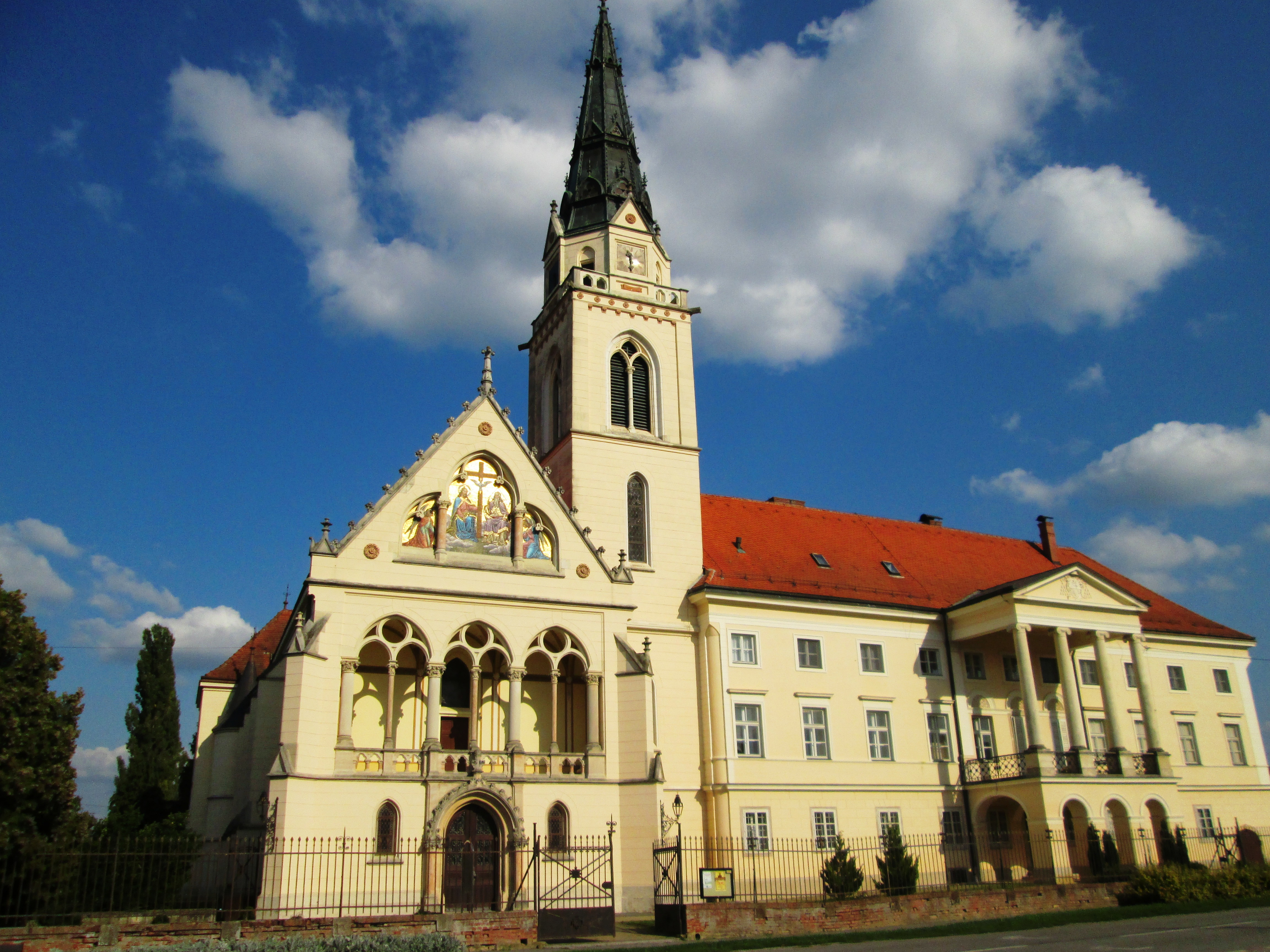
Križevci Cathedral

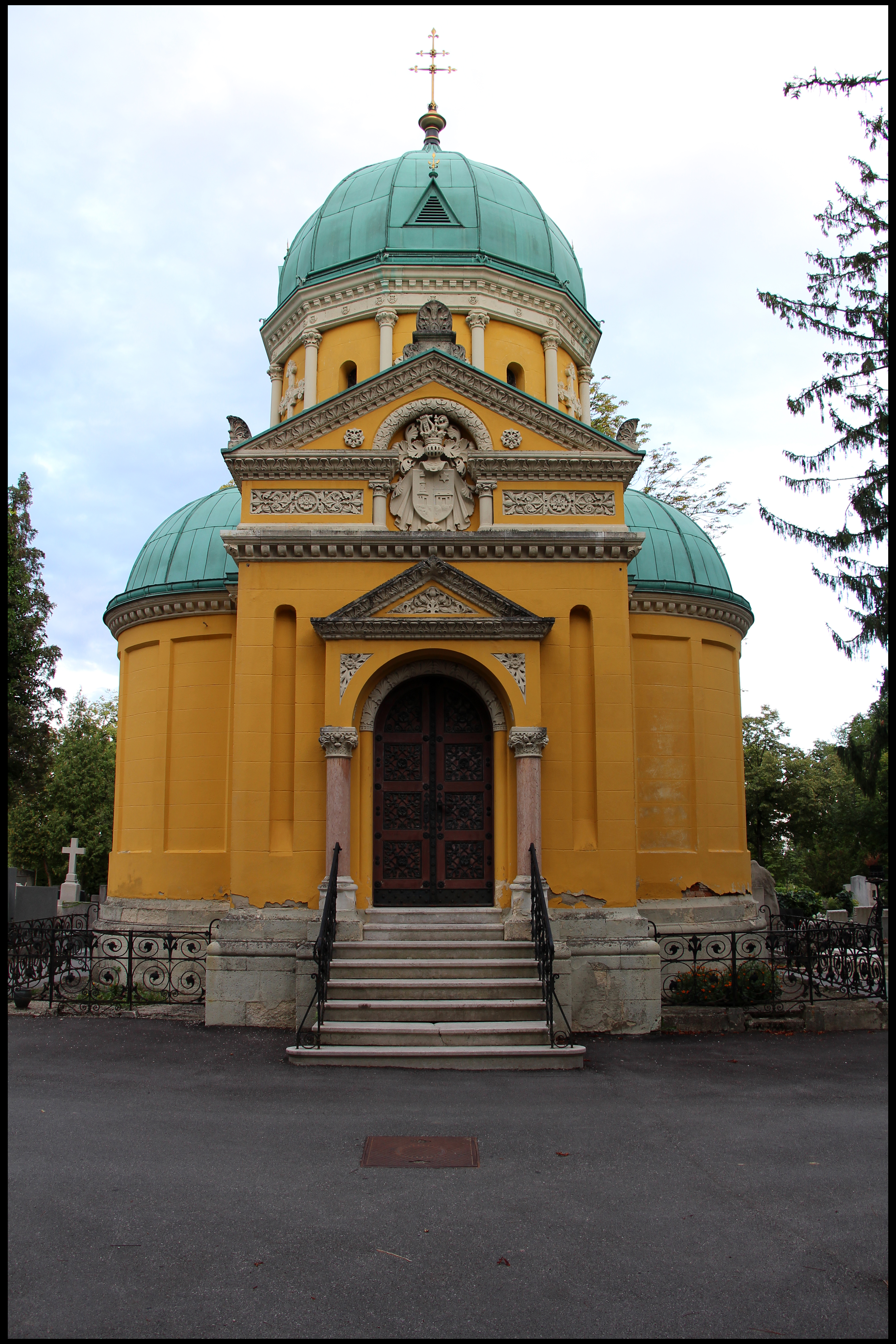
Mirogoj Cemetery

== Sources ==
- "Herman Bollé – veliki hrvatski graditelj i pedagog" (PDF). Građevinar (in Croatian) (57): 801–807. 2005. Archived (PDF) from the original on 3 September 2013.
