= Carl Roesner =

Austrian architect

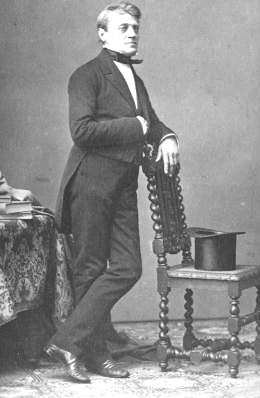
Carl Roesner in 1860

Carl Roesner (19 June 1804, Vienna - 13 July 1869, Steyr) was an Austrian architect.

== Life ==
He studied architecture in Vienna and Rome. In 1826, he began his work as a proofreader for lectures at the Academy of Fine Arts Vienna and, in 1835, became a Professor there. He gravitated to the Romanticists and concentrated on sacred art. Wilhelm Stiassny was one of his students. He was also editor of the Allgemeine Bauzeitung (General Construction News).

As he worked during the time of the Austro-Hungarian Empire, many of his buildings are now outside Austria. A street in Vienna's Meidling district was named the "Roesnergasse" in his honor.

== Selected projects ==
- Friedhofskapelle Pinkafeld, Pinkafeld, 1835
- Erlöserkirche, Landstraße, 1836
- Johann Nepomuk Kirche, Praterstraße, Leopoldstadt, 1841–1846
- Meidlinger Pfarrkirche, Meidling, 1845
- St. Ulrich of Augsburg Church, Smlednik (central Slovenia), 1847
- Arsenalkirche, Landstraße, 1856
- St.Josephs Kirche, Kalocsa, 1859
- Cathedral of St. Peter and St. Paul, Đakovo, begun 1866, completed by Friedrich von Schmidt and Hermann Bollé
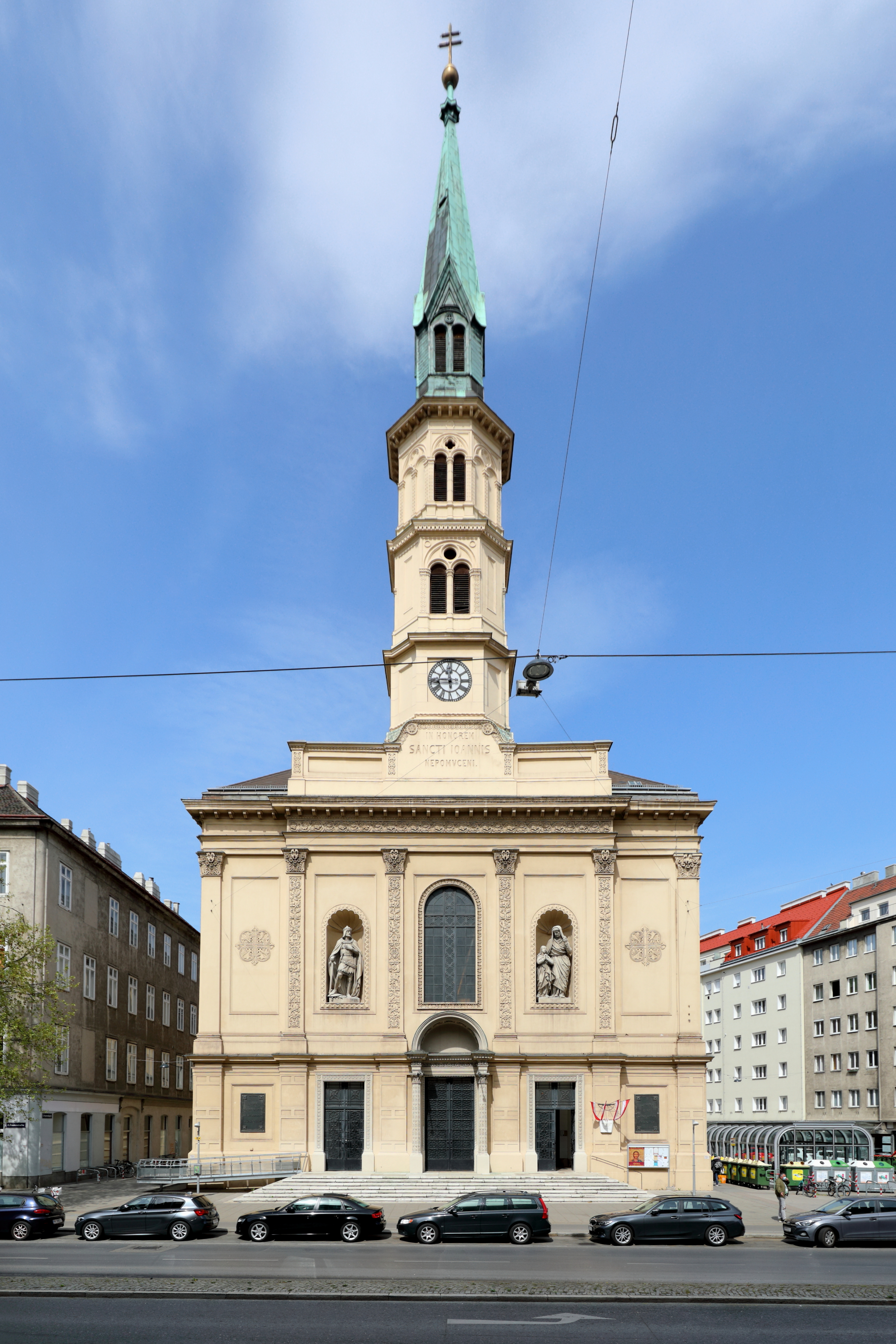
St. Johann Nepomuk Church, Vienna

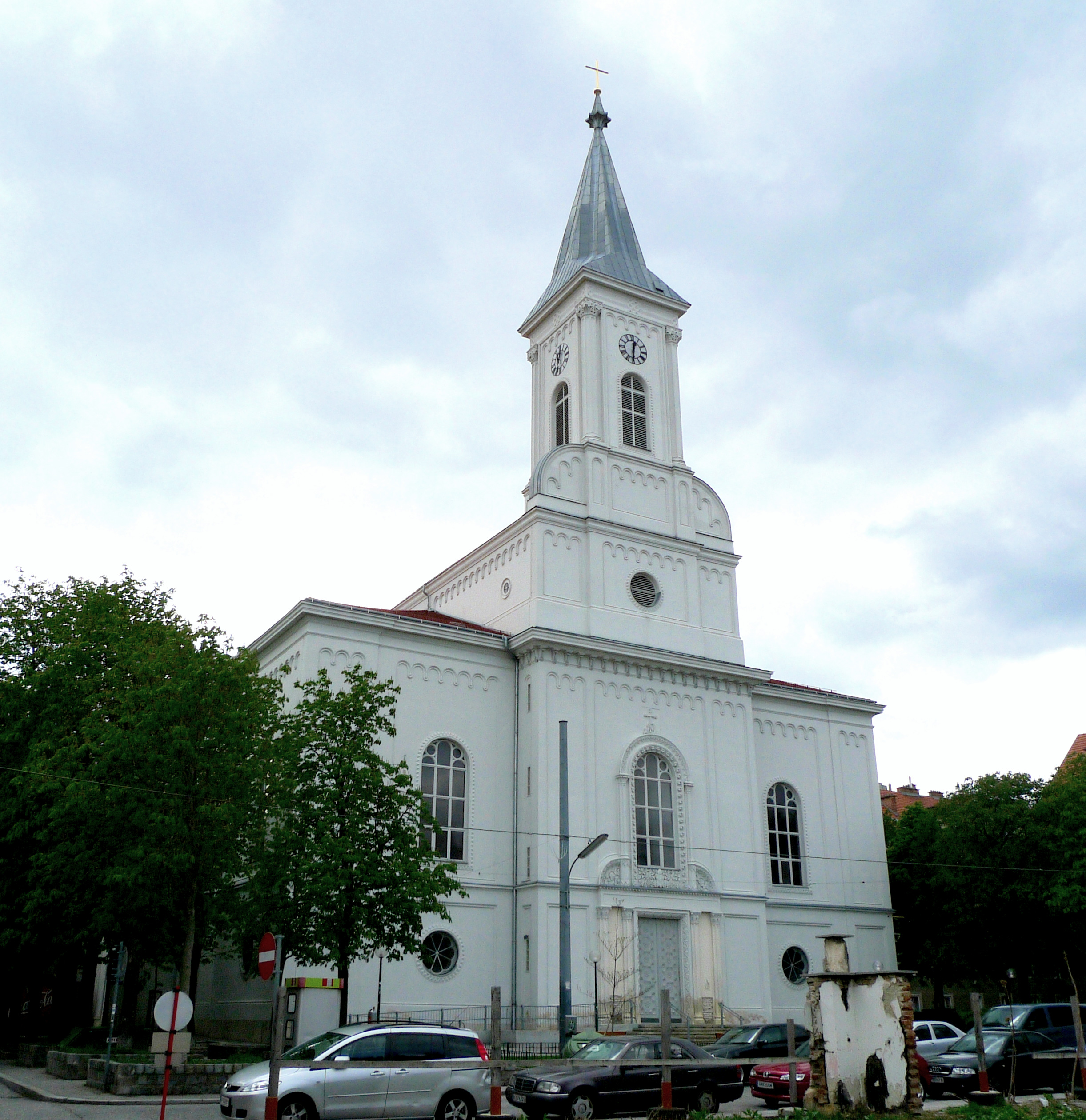
Pfarrkirche

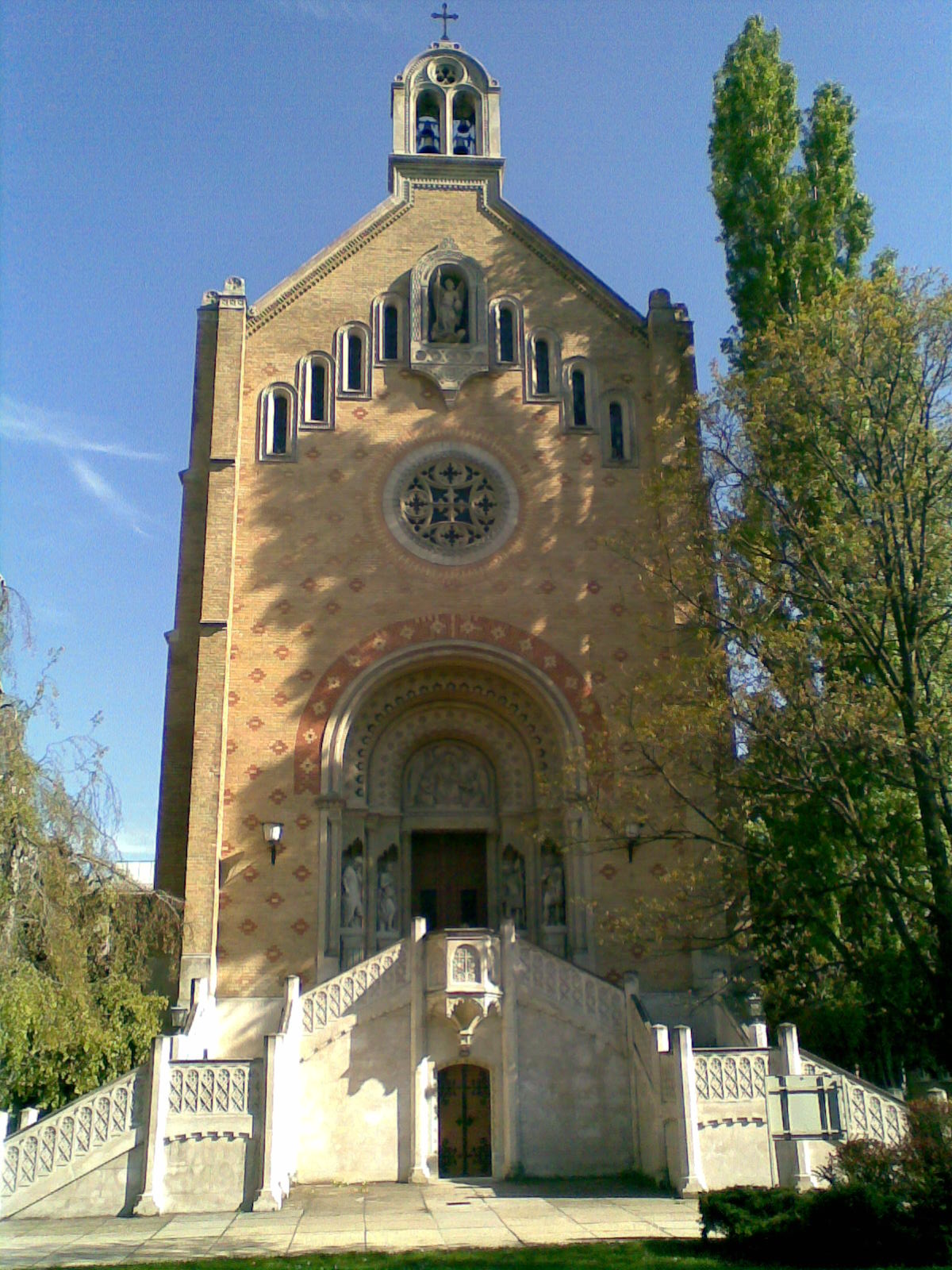
Arsenalkirche

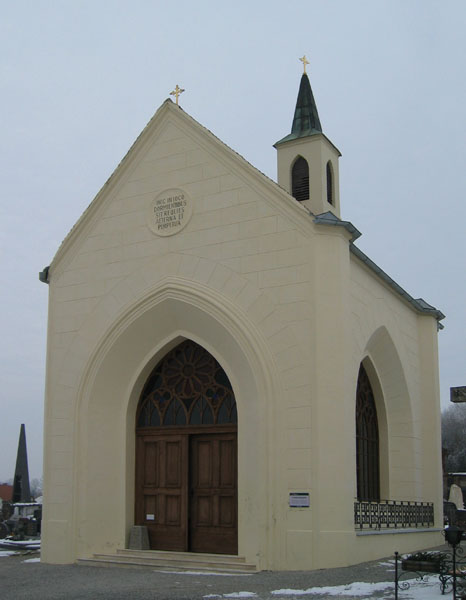
Friedhofskapelle

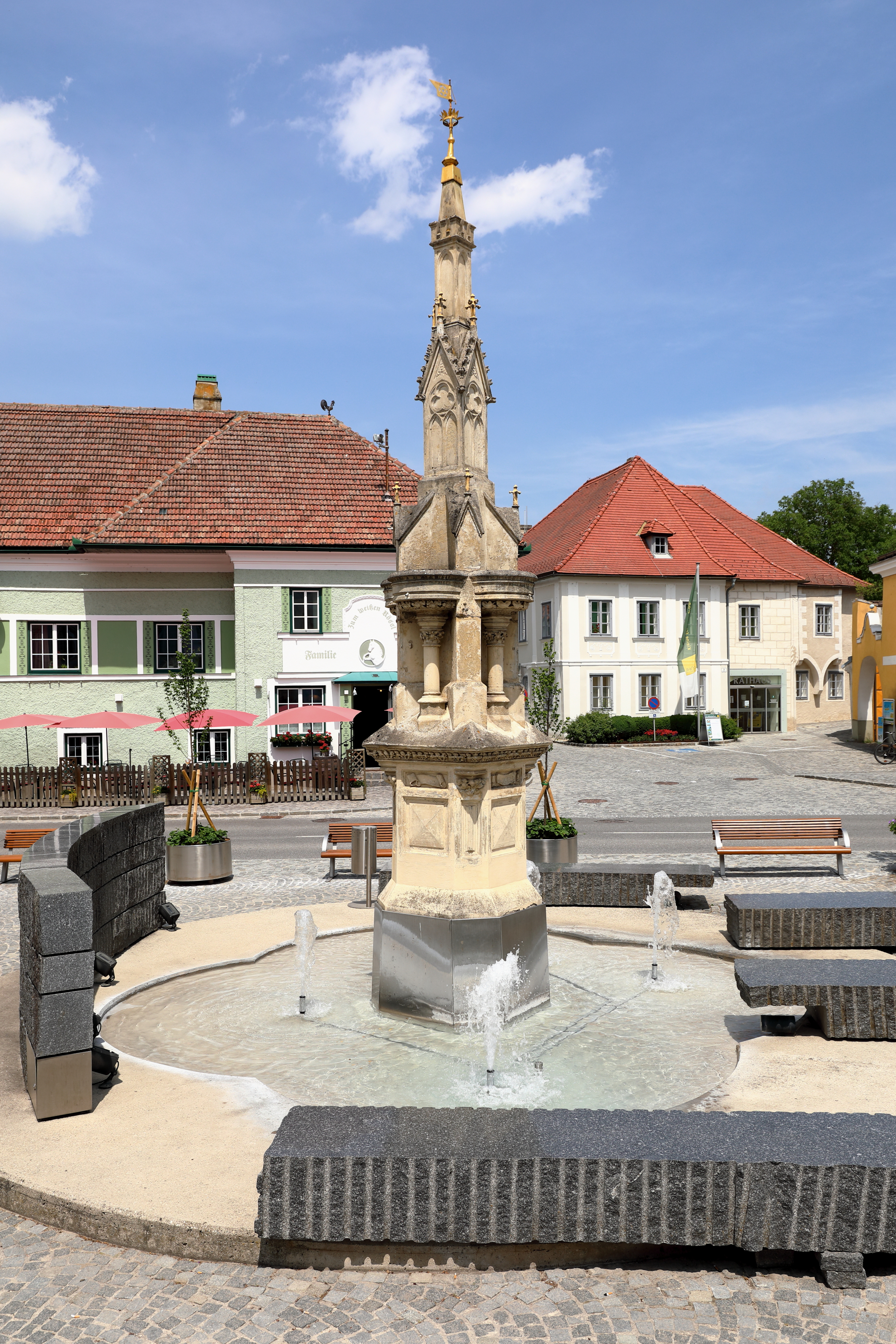
Fountain in Gföhl

== Sources ==
- R. Goebl: "Roesner Karl". In: Österreichisches Biographisches Lexikon 1815–1950 (ÖBL). Vol. 9, Austrian Academy of Sciences, Vienna 1988, ISBN 3-7001-1483-4, p. 205 f. (Direct links to "p. 205", "p. 206")
