= Karl Troll =

Austrian architect (1865-1954)

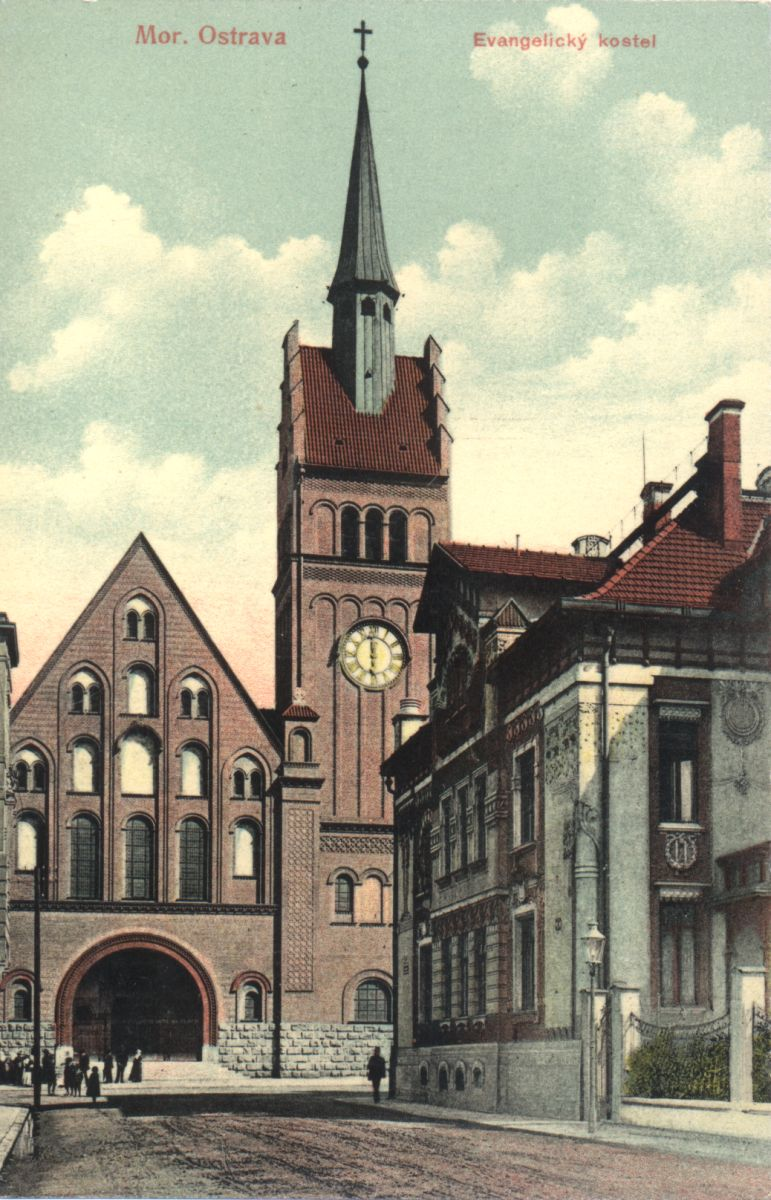
Evangelical Church in Moravská Ostrava - historical picture

Karl Troll (November 1, 1865 in Oberwölbling, Lower Austria – December 30, 1954 in Vienna) was an Austrian architect.

Karl Troll was the son of a carpenter from a small village in Lower Austria. He was sent to Vienna to learn textile printing in a vocational school. During 1886–89 he studied at the Academy of Fine Arts in Vienna under Friedrich von Schmidt. As an excellent student with interest in medieval churches he obtained a scholarship for a study trip to Germany and Italy (about 1892).

During 1893–1905 Troll worked in the architecture bureau of Franz von Neumann. He won an award for his participation in the design of the St. Anton Church in Vienna-10. Among his independent projects were the city school in Antonsplatz, Vienna 10 (together with Anton Rehak in 1902) and Evangelical Church in Moravská Ostrava (together with Ludwig Faigl in 1905–07).

After the death of Neumann, Karl Troll and Johann Stoppel, another member of the bureau, started an independent office. Their largest projects were Saint Leopold Church in Donaufeld (1904–14, based on drafts by Neumann) and catholic church in Grillenberg (part of Hernstein, Baden district, Lower Austria). Many other proposals, however, were not implemented.

The collapse of Austria-Hungary (1918) started the social decline of Karl Troll. His partner Stoppel died that year and there's no evidence of any subsequent projects under Troll's name. He probably gave up the independence to become an employee. A later correspondence between architects suggests he lived very poorly.
