= Strossmayer Street =

Street in Sarajevo, Bosnia and Herzegovina

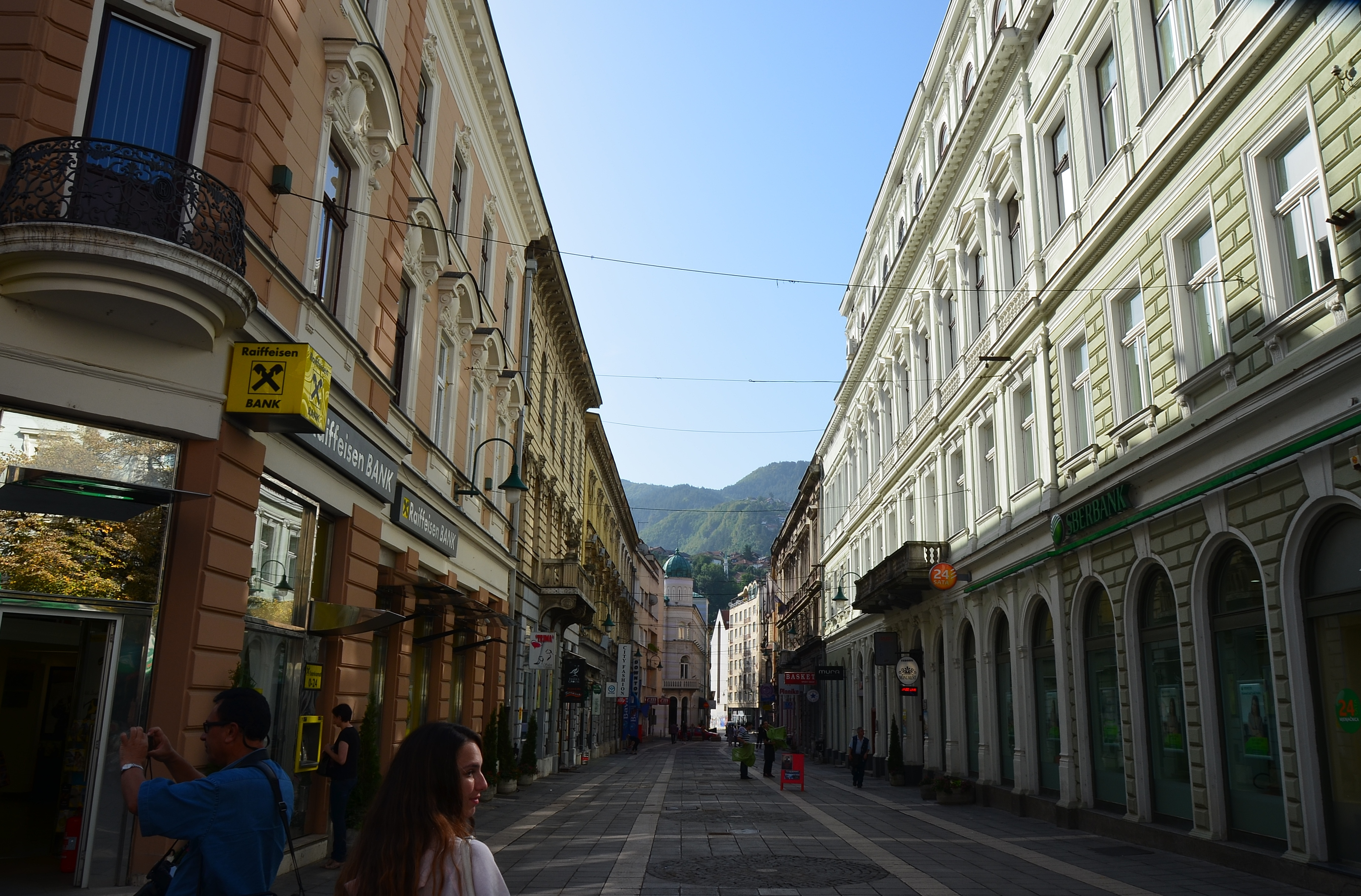
- Strossmayer Street in 2015
- Interactive map of Strossmayer Street
- Native name: Štrosmajerova ulica (Bosnian)
- Former name: Rudolf Street (Rudolfova ulica)
- Length: 0.12 km (0.075 mi)
- Postal code: 71000
- Coordinates: 43°51′32.44″N 18°25′31.89″E
- North: Ferhadija street
- South: Zelenih beretki Street

Strossmayer Street (Bosnian: Štrosmajerova ulica; Serbo-Croatian Cyrillic: Штросмајерова улица) is a pedestrian thoroughfare located in the Stari Grad municipality of Sarajevo, Bosnia and Herzegovina. The street connects the historic and the modern parts of the city and is known for Austro-Hungarian architecture.

== History ==
It was originally constructed during the Austro-Hungarian administration in the late 19th century. The street was initially named Rudolfova ulica (Rudolf Street) in honour of Crown Prince Rudolf, the son of Emperor Franz Joseph I. On 10 January 1919, following the formation of the Kingdom of Serbs, Croats and Slovenes, the street was renamed to honour Josip Juraj Strossmayer, a Croatian bishop, politician and proponent of Yugoslavism.

== Location and layout ==
Štrosmajerova Street runs north-south, connecting Zelenih Beretki Street to the junction of Ferhadija Street and Trg fra Grge Martića, directly in front of the Sacred Heart Cathedral.

== Status ==
In April 2019, Štrosmajerova Street was declared a National Monument of Bosnia and Herzegovina by the Commission for the Preservation of National Monuments.
