= Đakovo Cathedral =

Coordinates: 45.3075°N 18.4111°E

- Cathedral basilica of St. Peter in Đakovo; Saint Peter’s Cathedral
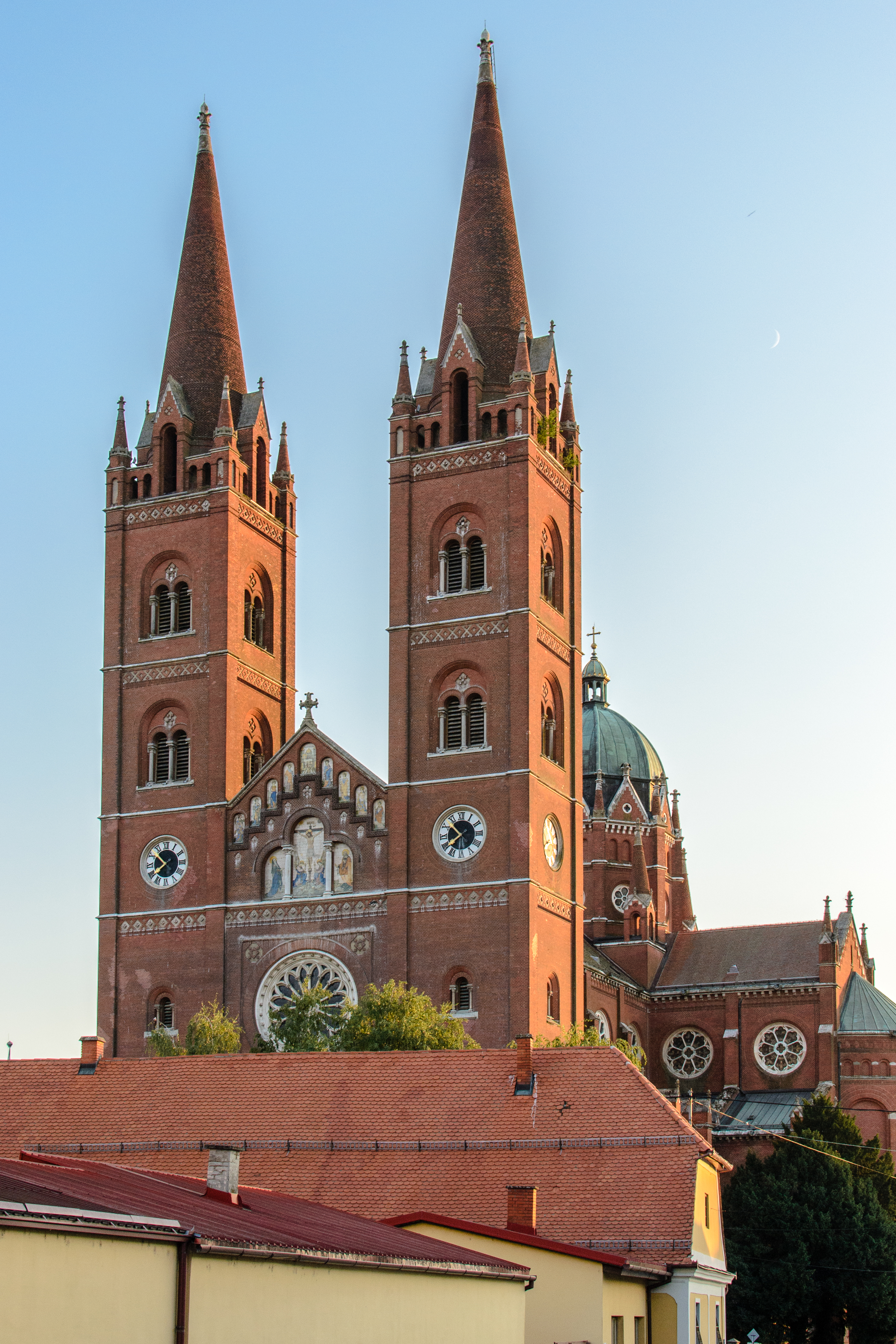
- Đakovo Cathedral
- Đakovo Cathedral
- Country: Croatia
- Denomination: Roman Catholic
- Website: Đakovačko-osječka nabiskupija

Architecture
- Architect(s): Carl Roesner and Friedrich von Schmidt
- Style: Romanesque Revival architecture

Specifications
- Height: 84 m

The Đakovo Cathedral or Cathedral basilica of St. Peter (Croatian: Katedrala bazilika Svetog Petra) is the cathedral of the Roman Catholic Archdiocese of Đakovo-Osijek in Đakovo, Croatia.

Đakovo Cathedral is the biggest sacral newly built building of Croatian historicism. The St. Peter Cathedral in Đakovo is the town's most famous landmark and the most important sacral object.

The cathedral was built 1866-1882 under Josip Juraj Strossmayer, who was the bishop of the Catholic diocese of Đakovo and Srijem. The architects of the cathedral are Carl Roesner and Friedrich von Schmidt from Vienna. Fresco paintings depicting scenes from the Old Testament in the nave and the New Testament scenes from the life of St Peter in the chancel were executed by the Roman painters of German origin Alexander Maximillian and Lodovico Seitz, except for two frescoes which were painted by Achille Ansiglioni. The scenes from the life of St Peter were partially made according to the drawings created for Đakovo Cathedral by one of the leading Nazarene painters Friedrich Overbeck.

The landscaped park from the 19th century near the bishop's palace is a horticultural monument under special protection as well as the nearby Small Park (Mali Park) dating from the turn of the 19th/20th century.

Đakovo Cathedral was built in 4 years, and another 12 years was spent decorating the inside.

== History ==
Preparations for the construction of the new Đakovo Cathedral, intended to replace the old and rather modest Baroquised medieval structure located behind the Bishop’s Palace, began as early as the late 18th and early 19th centuries. Primarily due to a lack of financial resources, the cathedral was built only between 1866 and 1882. The main initiator of its construction was the Bishop of Đakovo, Josip Juraj Strossmayer.

Strossmayer began the first steps toward building his new cathedral in the early 1850s. He entered into contact with the Viennese architect Karl Rösner, who completed his first design for Đakovo in 1854. This project was ultimately not realised due to a shortage of funds and Strossmayer’s reconsideration of the cathedral’s stylistic concept. Rösner was re-engaged in 1865 to produce new designs and completed his second and third projects for Đakovo that same year. Construction of the cathedral began in 1866 based on Rösner’s third design.

Rösner died in 1869, after which, in September 1870, he was succeeded as chief architect by Friedrich von Schmidt, who directed the works until 1882, the year of the cathedral’s consecration.

Between 1876 and 1882, and even later, Schmidt was assisted by architect Hermann Bollé in preparing designs for the cathedral’s furnishings. Strossmayer intended to entrust the fresco decoration to the German Nazarene painter Johann Friedrich Overbeck, who, before his death, managed only to produce cartoons for the frescoes, from which the decoration was later partially executed. The frescoes were carried out by father and son, Alexander Maximilian and Lodovico Seitz, followers of the Nazarene movement in Rome. Croatian sculptors Vatroslav Donegani and Ivan Rendić created most of the altar sculptures and reliefs in the cathedral.

While travelling through Đakovo on his way to a diplomatic post in Bulgaria, the future Pope John XXIII described the Đakovo Cathedral as “the most beautiful church between Venice and Constantinople.”

In the cathedral’s crypt lies the tomb of Bishop Strossmayer.

== Organ ==
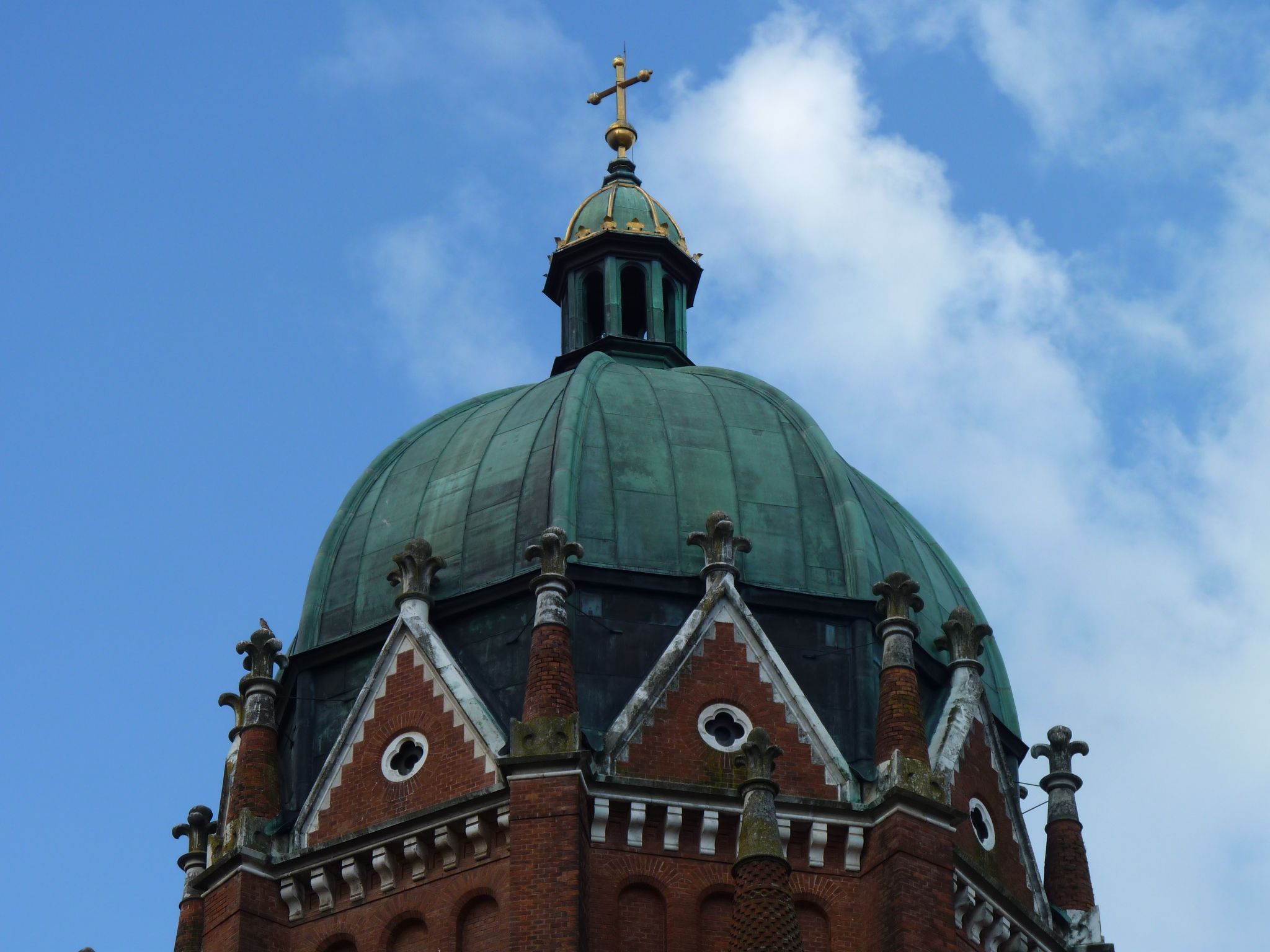
Dome of the Cathedral

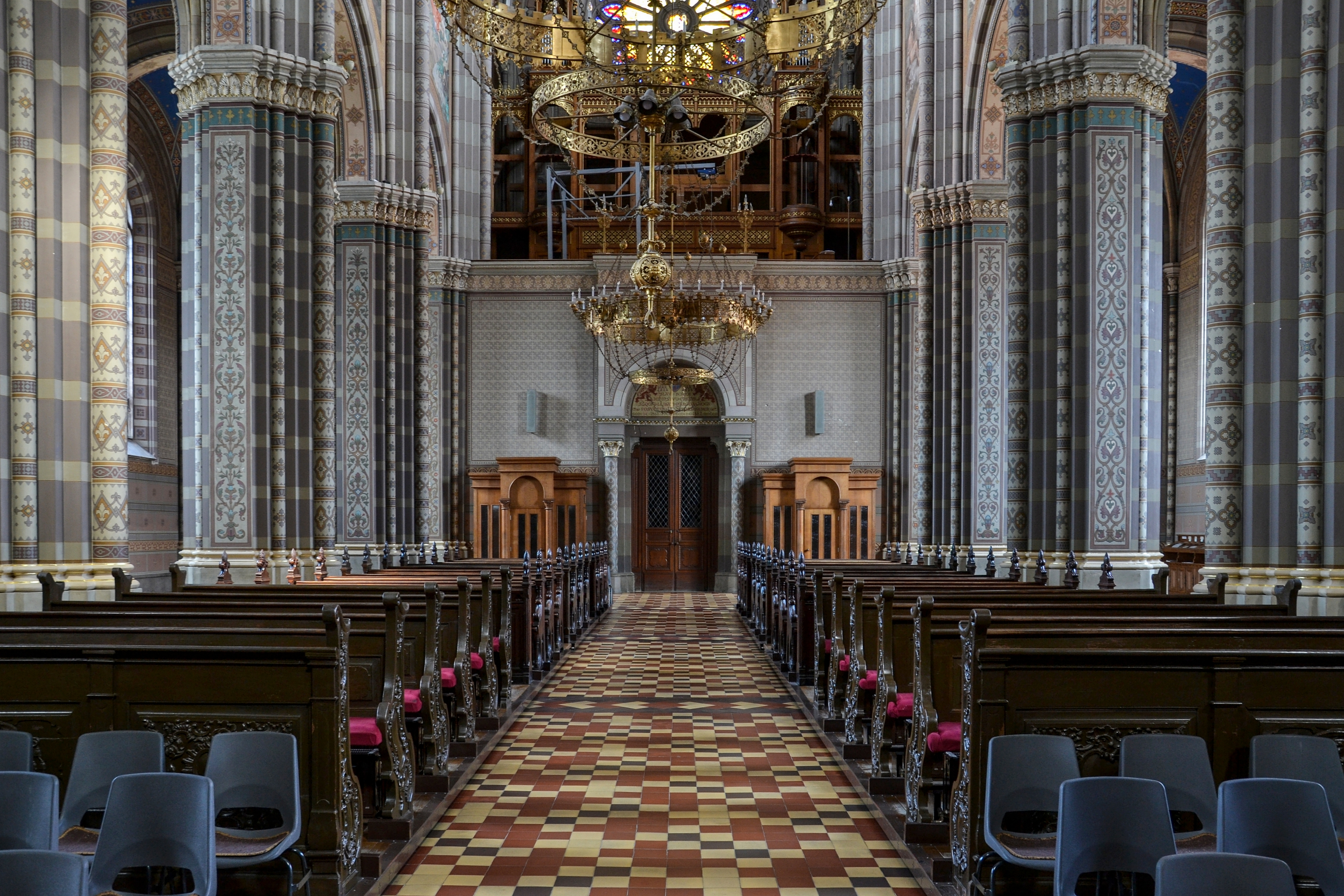
Interior of the Cathedral

The first organ of the new Strossmayer Cathedral — specifically, the original instrument — was built between 1879 and 1882 in Oettingen (Bavaria) by the Steinmayer company. The organ case was made by Viennese carpenter Karger according to the designs of Friedrich von Schmidt, further developed by his pupil Hermann Bollé. It was, for its time, a very large and high-quality instrument, awarded a gold medal at the Bavarian State Exhibition in Nuremberg in 1882.

The design created by the mentioned architects, combining elements of the Romanesque and Gothic styles, harmoniously matched the interior of the Đakovo Cathedral. It resembled numerous other organs designed by Schmidt for Austrian churches of that period (e.g. the churches in the Vienna districts of Brigittenau and Fünfhaus, the Franciscan Church in Innsbruck, etc.).

These original organs were destroyed in a major fire in 1933. A new instrument was built in 1936 by the Franc Jenko company from Šentvid near Ljubljana, under the supervision of leading Croatian organ experts Franjo Dugan and Franc Kimovec. The new organ was significantly larger, though its casing largely retained the earlier Schmidt–Bollé design, slightly modified by removing certain Gothic elements to better harmonise with the cathedral’s interior.

As of 2007, the instrument had the following disposition:

I. Manual C–a^{3}
Tibia	16′
Principal	16′
Dolce	8′
Unda maris	8′
Harm. flute	8′
Gamshorn	8′
Copula	8′
Gamba	8′
Diapason	8′
Keraulophon	4′
Tibia minor	4′
Octave	4′
Blockflöte	2′
Superoctave	2′
Cornet	8′
Mixture IV	2 2/3′
Cymbal	1 1/3′
Bassoon	16′
Tuba	8′

II. Manual C–a^{3}
Bourdon	16′
Viola d’amore	16′
Principal	8′
Concert viola	8′
Quintadena	8′
Gedackt	8′
Flute	8′
Prestant	4′
Rohrflöte	4′
Traversflöte	4′
Quint	2 2/3′
Tierce	1 3/5′
Superoctave	2′
Piccolo	1′
Mixture	2 2/3′
Clarinet	8′
Harmonic trumpet	8′

III. Manual C–a^{3}
Lieblichgedackt	16′
Viol. principal	8′
Aeoline	8′
Vox coelestis	8′
Concert flute	8′
Dulciana	8′
Nachthorn	8′
Fugara	8′
Dolce	4′
Flute amabile	4′
Principalino	4′
Nazard	2 2/3′
Flautina	2′
Sifflöte	1′
Terzian	1 3/5′ + 1 1/3′
Harm. aethera	2 2/3′
Oboe	8′
Vox humana	8′
Tremulant

Pedal C–f^{1}
Grand bourdon	32′
Bourdon bass	16′
Salicet bass	16′
Principal bass	16′
Violon bass	16′
Quint bass	10 2/3′
Bourdonal bass	8′
Octave bass	8′
Violoncello	8′
Choral bass	4′
Superoctave	2′
Cornet	5 1/3′
Bombarde	32′
Tuba	16′
Posaune	8′
Clarina	4′

Couplers: II–I, III–I, III–II, I–P, II–P, III–P. Supercouplers: Sup II–I, Sup III–I, Sup III–II, Sup III, Sup II, Sup III–P, Sup I–P. Subcouplers: Sub II–I, Sub III–I, Sub III–II. Collectives: P, MF, Grand Jeu, F, FF, Pleno. Accessories: two free combinations, reed stop cancel, crescendo roller, swell pedal for III manual, bass melody, automatic pianopedal, 32′+16′ cancel, stop switch.

== Interior ==
The Đakovo Cathedral is renowned for its richly decorated interior and unified artistic concept envisioned by Bishop Josip Juraj Strossmayer and executed between 1870 and 1882. Designed in the Neo-Romanesque and Neo-Gothic styles, the cathedral’s decoration reflects a synthesis of theology, symbolism, and fine art.

=== Frescoes ===
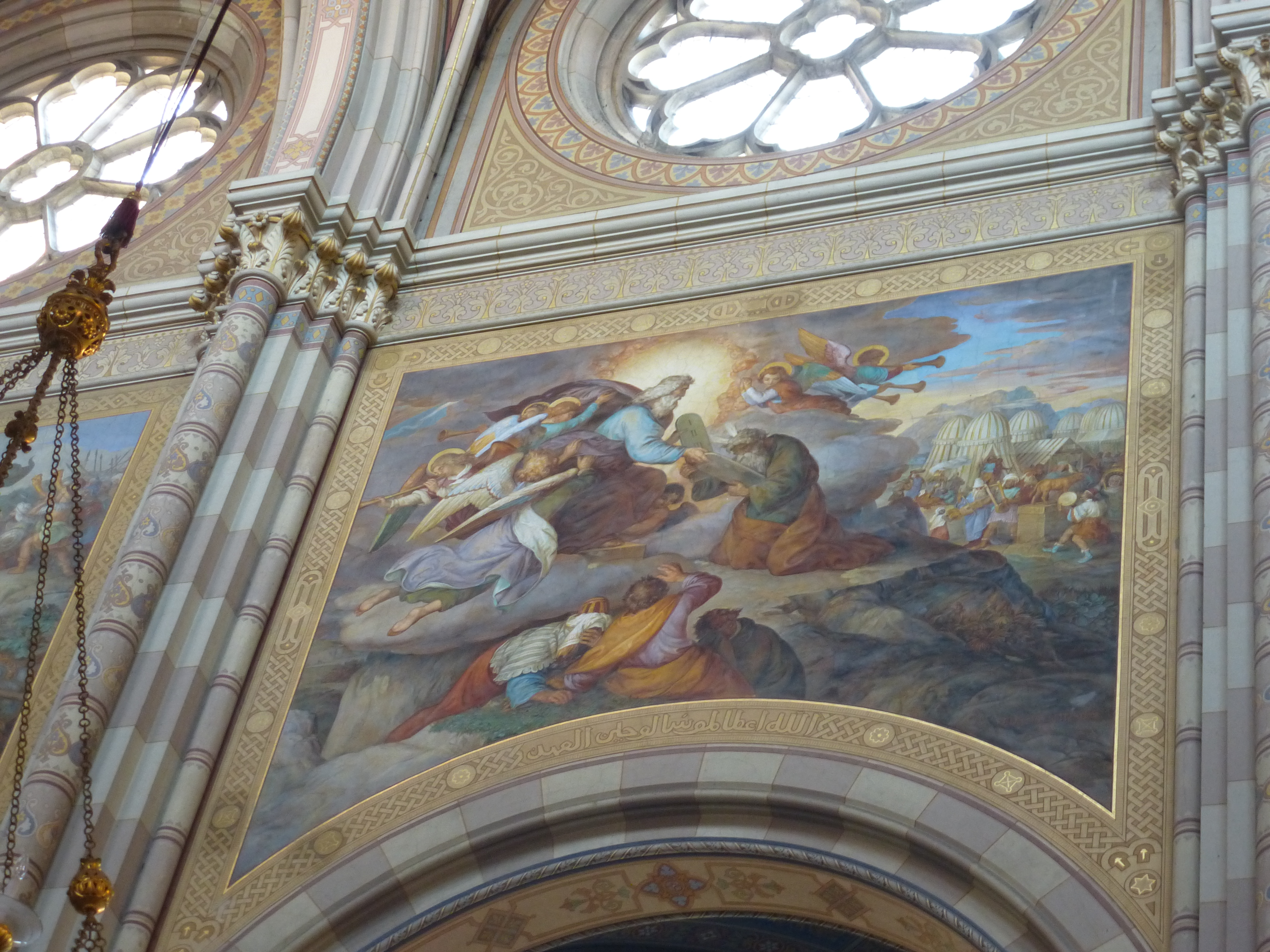
One of the frescoes

In 1870, Bishop Strossmayer commissioned Roman-based German painters Alexander Maximilian Seitz and his son Ludwig Seitz, adherents of the “Roman Nazarene” movement, to create the cathedral’s monumental fresco program. Over twelve years, the artists and their assistants painted 43 frescoes covering over 1,000 m². The paintings depict scenes from both Testaments: ten from the Old Testament along the central nave and New Testament themes across the transept and apses. The program symbolically follows the form of the Latin cross—Old Testament stories along the longitudinal axis and New Testament scenes across the transept—culminating at the altar, symbolizing Christ as the center of salvation history.

=== Altars and Sculpture ===
The cathedral contains seven altars and a richly carved pulpit. The 15-meter-high main altar, designed by Friedrich Schmidt and sculpted by Vatroslav Donegani, is dedicated to St. Peter and crowned by a monumental ciborium supported by marble columns. Its iconographic program unites the Evangelists, Church Fathers, and angels around the symbol of the Cross. Six side altars honor saints associated with the diocese, including St. Elijah, St. Demetrius, St. Joseph, and the Apostles Cyril and Methodius. The sculptures—executed by artists such as Donegani and Josef Philipp—reflect the Romanesque-Gothic synthesis typical of Strossmayer’s artistic vision.

=== Pulpit and Episcopal Throne ===
The pulpit, designed by Hermann Bollé and sculpted by Donegani, features reliefs of biblical scenes and statues of prominent Christian preachers such as St. Thomas Aquinas and St. Ignatius of Loyola. The bishop’s throne and choir stalls, crafted in oak by Schmidt’s design, include a 14th-century wooden relief of the Madonna and Child acquired by Strossmayer in Rome.

=== Crypt and Strossmayer’s Tomb ===
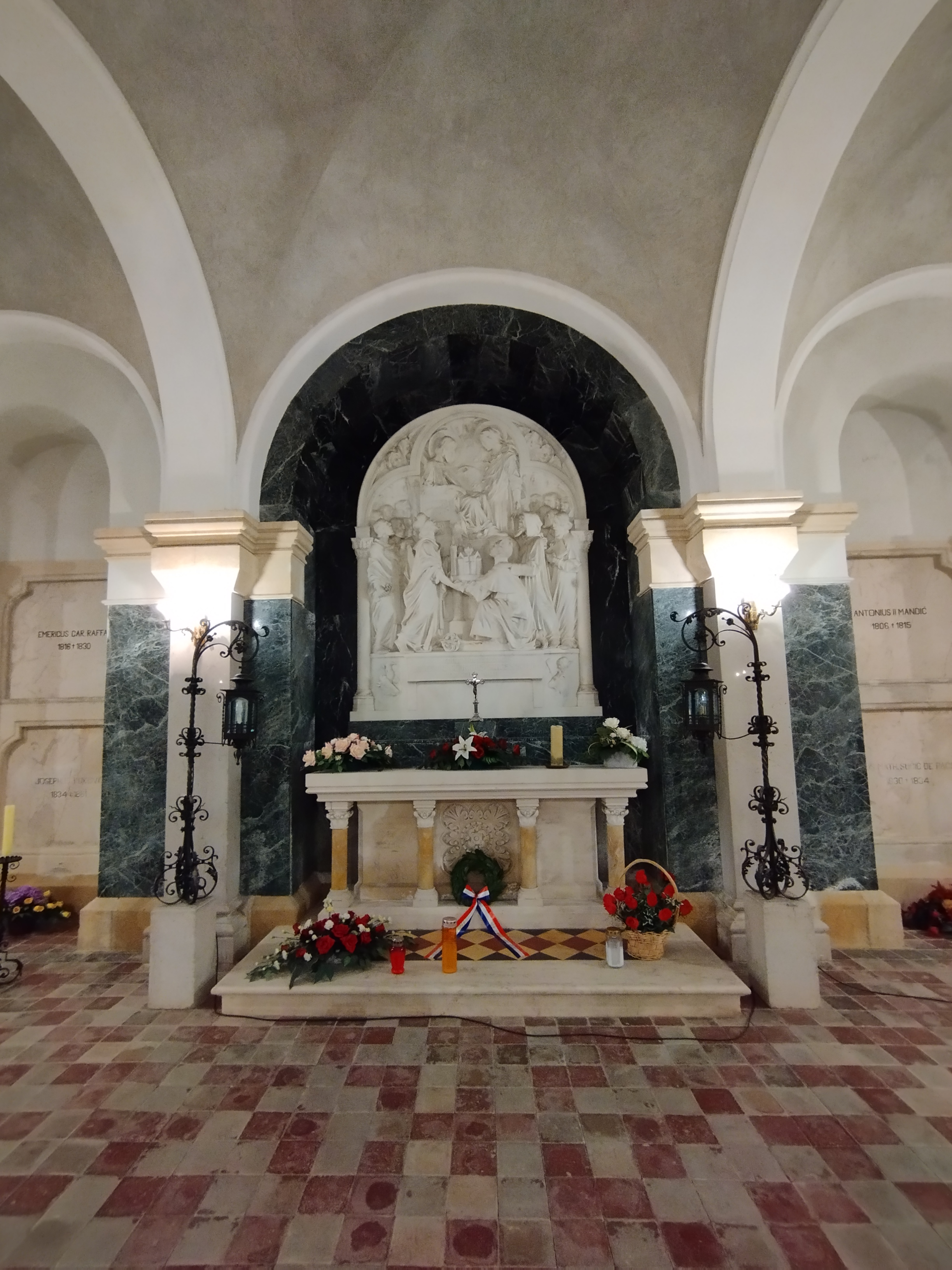
Burial site of Josip Juraj Strossmayer

Beneath the sanctuary lies the crypt, containing the tombs of Bishop Strossmayer and his successors. Strossmayer’s white marble epitaph, sculpted by Rudolf Valdec in 1913, depicts the bishop kneeling before Christ the Judge, presenting the cathedral he built, accompanied by St. Cyril and St. Methodius.

=== Exterior Decoration and Portals ===
The red-brick façade features three portals with white-stone reliefs by sculptors Alojzij Gangl, Tomo Vodička, and Ivan Rendić. Above the main portal rises a large rose window and a ceramic tympanum designed by Ludwig Seitz and executed by Adriano Ferraresi. Its iconography centers on the Crucifixion, flanked by figures of the Virgin Mary and St. Peter, and crowned with a depiction of the “Heavenly Jerusalem,” expressing the theological essence of redemption and eternal life.

=== Organ and Stations of the Cross ===
The cathedral’s current organ, built by the Slovenian firm Franc Jenko, includes 73 registers and over 5,400 pipes. The marble Stations of the Cross, installed in 1968 by sculptor Lujo Lozica, commemorate the cathedral’s centenary and stand as a modern complement to its historic sculptural ensemble.

== See also ==
- Cathedral
- Catholic Church
- Roman Catholicism in Croatia
- Archdiocese of Đakovo-Osijek
- List of tallest structures built before the 20th century
- List of tallest buildings in Croatia

== Gallery ==
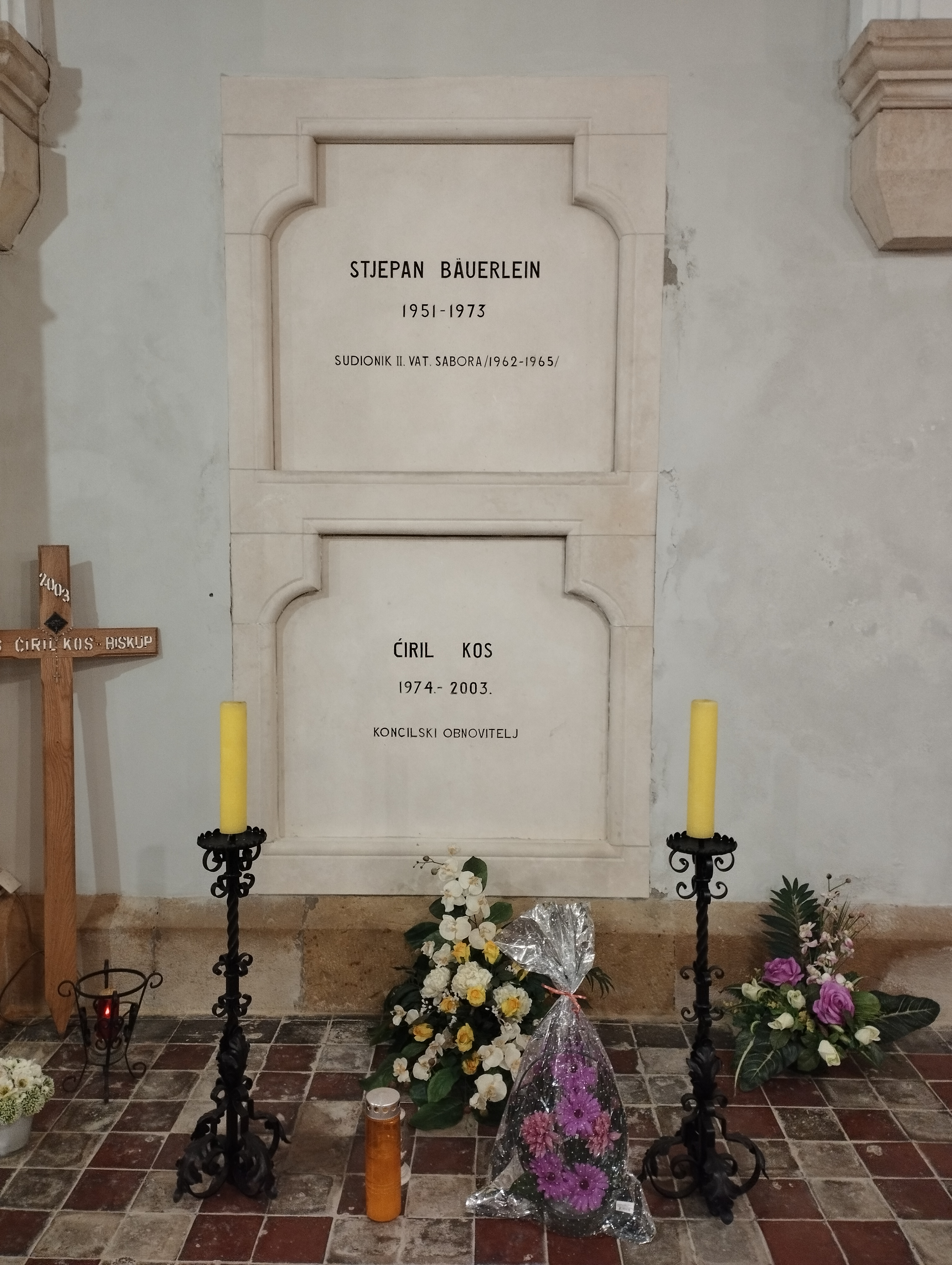
Stjepan Bauerlein & Ćiril Kos burial site

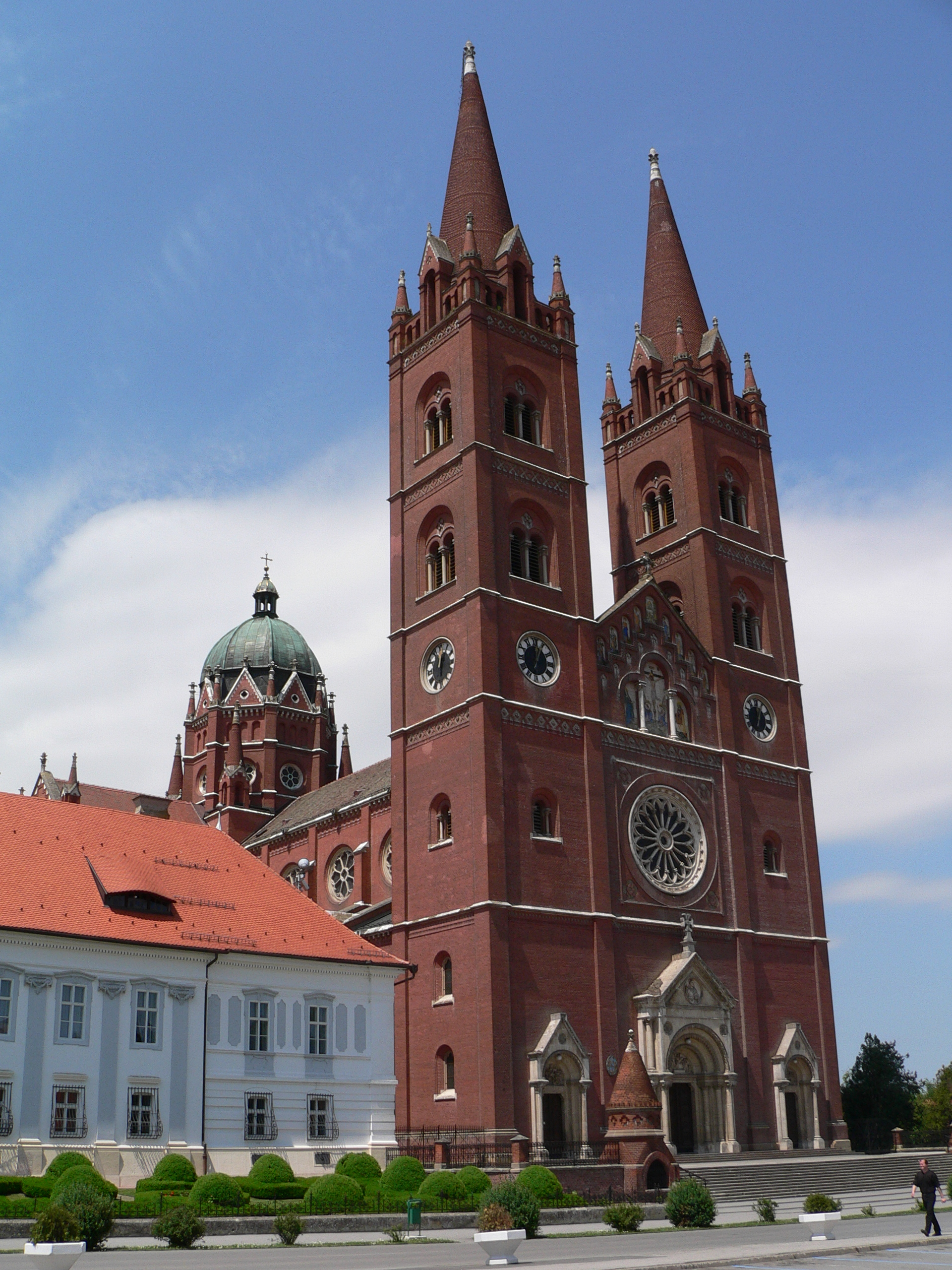
Facade

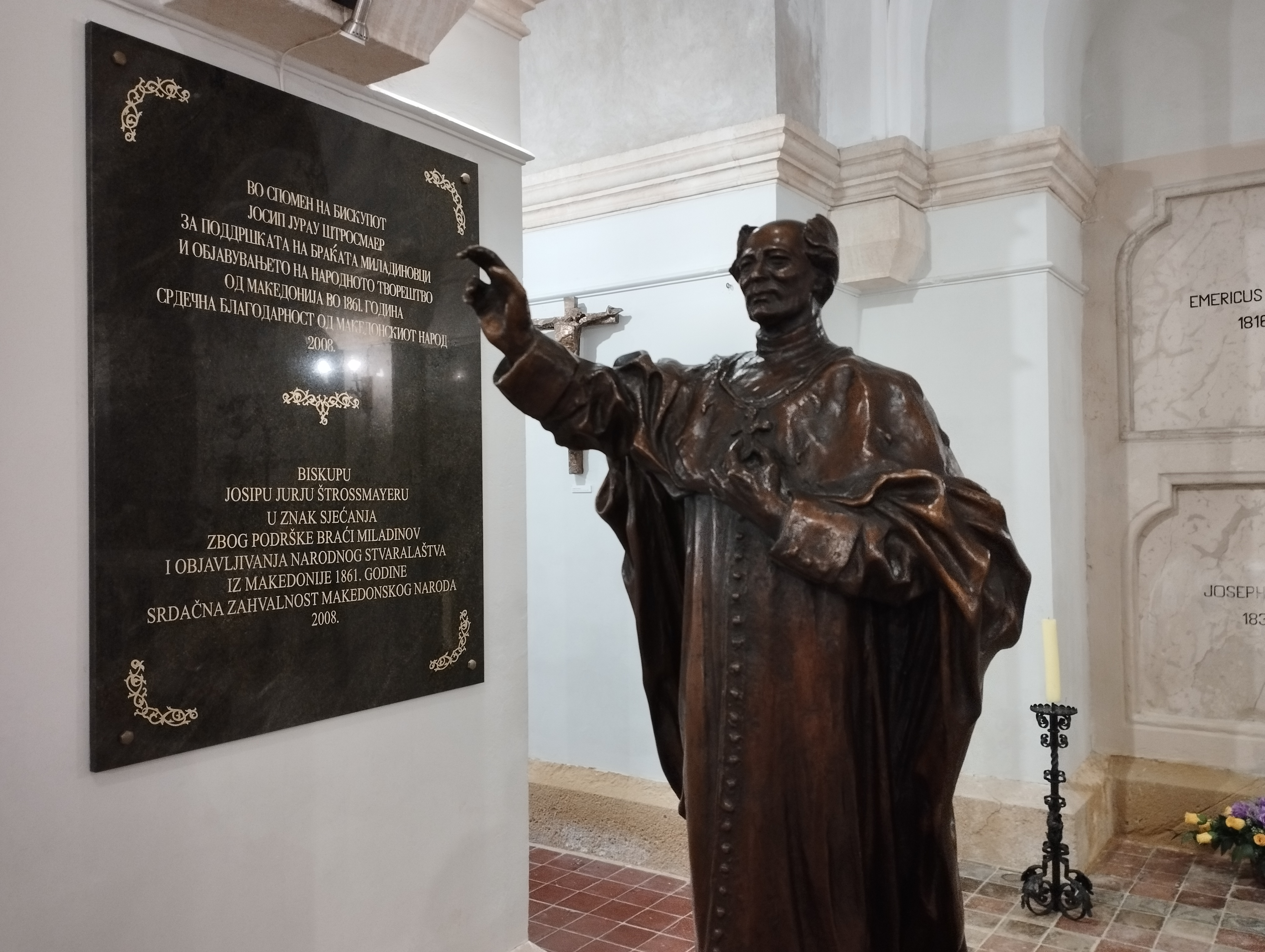
Macedonian memorial and Strossmayer statue

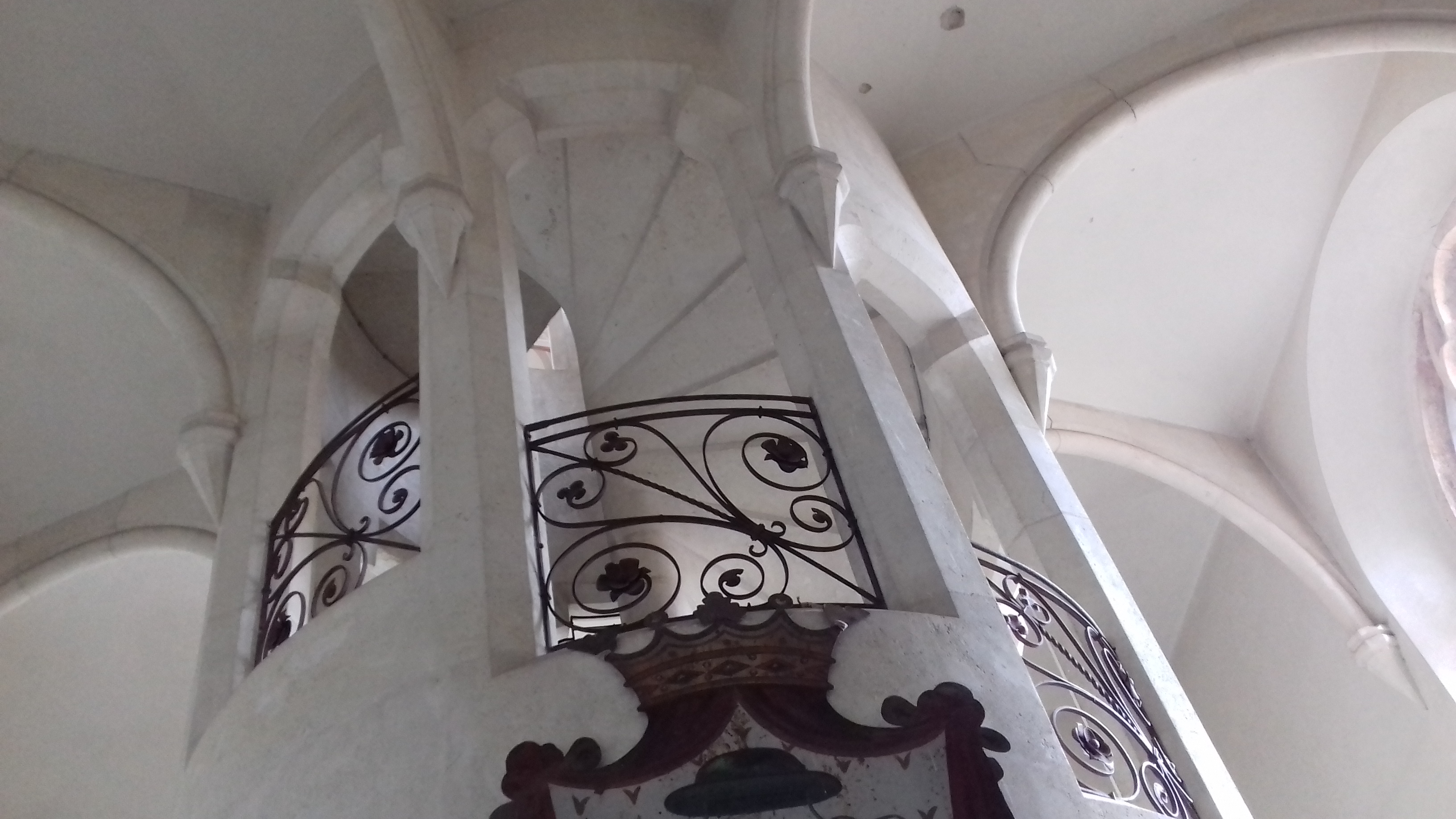
Stairs

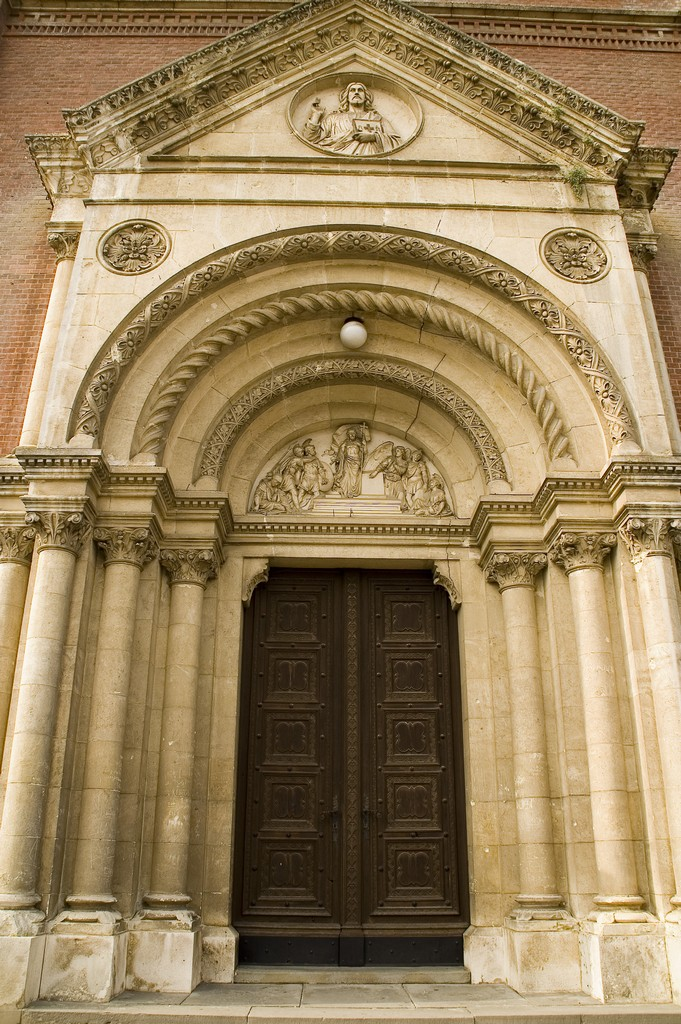
Portal

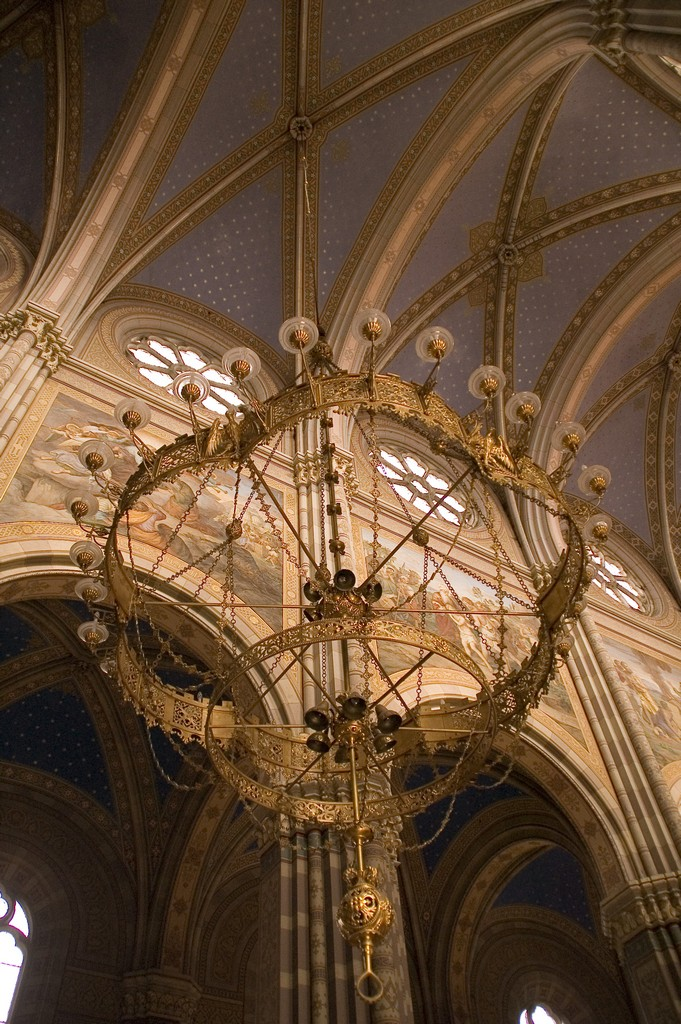
Ceiling details

== Sources ==
- Cepelić, Milko; Pavić, Matija, Josip Juraj Strossmayer, biskup bosansko-đakovački i srijemski, God. 1850-1900, Tisak dioničke tiskare, Zagreb, 1900-1904.
- Damjanović, Dragan (June 29, 2007). "Prvi projekt Karla Rösnera za katedralu u Đakovu iz 1854. godine" [Karl Rösner's First Design for Đakovo Cathedral from 1854]. Prostor, Architecture and Urban Planning Scientific Journal (in Croatian). 15 (1(33)): 2–25.
- Damjanović, Dragan, "Projects for Đakovo Cathedral from the End of the 18th and the Beginning of the 19th Century", Peristil, Nr. 50, pp 141–56, Zagreb, 2007.
- Damjanović, Dragan (June 30, 2008). "Stilsko rješenje izvedbenih projekata Karla Rösnera za katedralu u Ðakovu iz 1865. i 1867. godine" [Stylistic Features in Karl Rösner's Working Designs from 1865 and 1867 for the Cathedral in Đakovo]. Prostor (in Croatian). 16 (1(35)): 48–63.
- Damjanović, Dragan (June 30, 2009). "Nacionalne ideologije i umjetnost u 19. stoljeću na primjeru fresaka u apsidama Đakovačke katedrale" [National Ideologies and 19th Century Art on the Example of Frescoes in the Đakovo Cathedral Apses]. Društvena istraživanja. Časopis za opća društvena pitanja (in Croatian). 18 (3 (101)): 461–78.
