= Josip Juraj Strossmayer =

Croatian Roman Catholic Bishop and Benefactor (1815–1905)

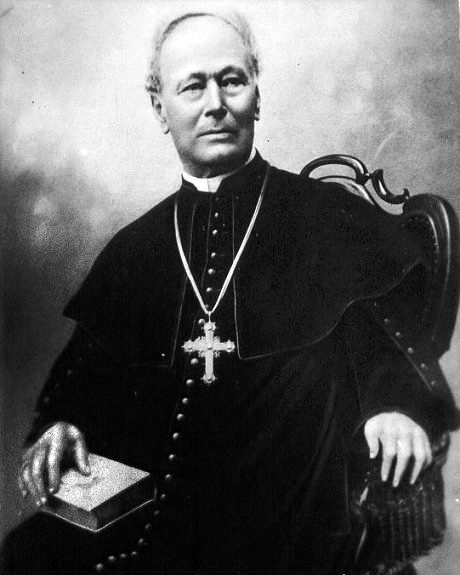
- Born: 4 February 1815; Osijek, Kingdom of Slavonia, Austrian Empire
- Died: 8 April 1905 (aged 90); Đakovo, Croatia-Slavonia, Austria-Hungary
- Resting place: Đakovo Cathedral, Đakovo, Croatia; 45°18′27.9″N 18°24′39″E
- Other name: Joseph Georg Strossmayer
- Education: University of Vienna
- Occupations: Bishop, politician, professor
- Years active: 1838–1905
- Known for: Founder of Yugoslav Academy of Sciences and Arts
- Political party: People's Party (until 1880); Independent People's Party (1880–1905)
- Movement: Illyrian Movement

Josip Juraj Strossmayer, also Štrosmajer (pronounced [jǒsip jûraj ʃtrǒsmajer]; German: Joseph Georg Strossmayer; 4 February 1815 – 8 April 1905) was a Croatian prelate of the Catholic Church, politician and benefactor. Between 1849 and his death, he served as the Bishop of Bosnia (Đakovo) and Syrmia. He was one of the key founders of the Yugoslav Academy of Sciences and Arts (today named Croatian Academy of Sciences and Arts) and the Gallery of Old Masters in Zagreb.

== Early life and Church career ==
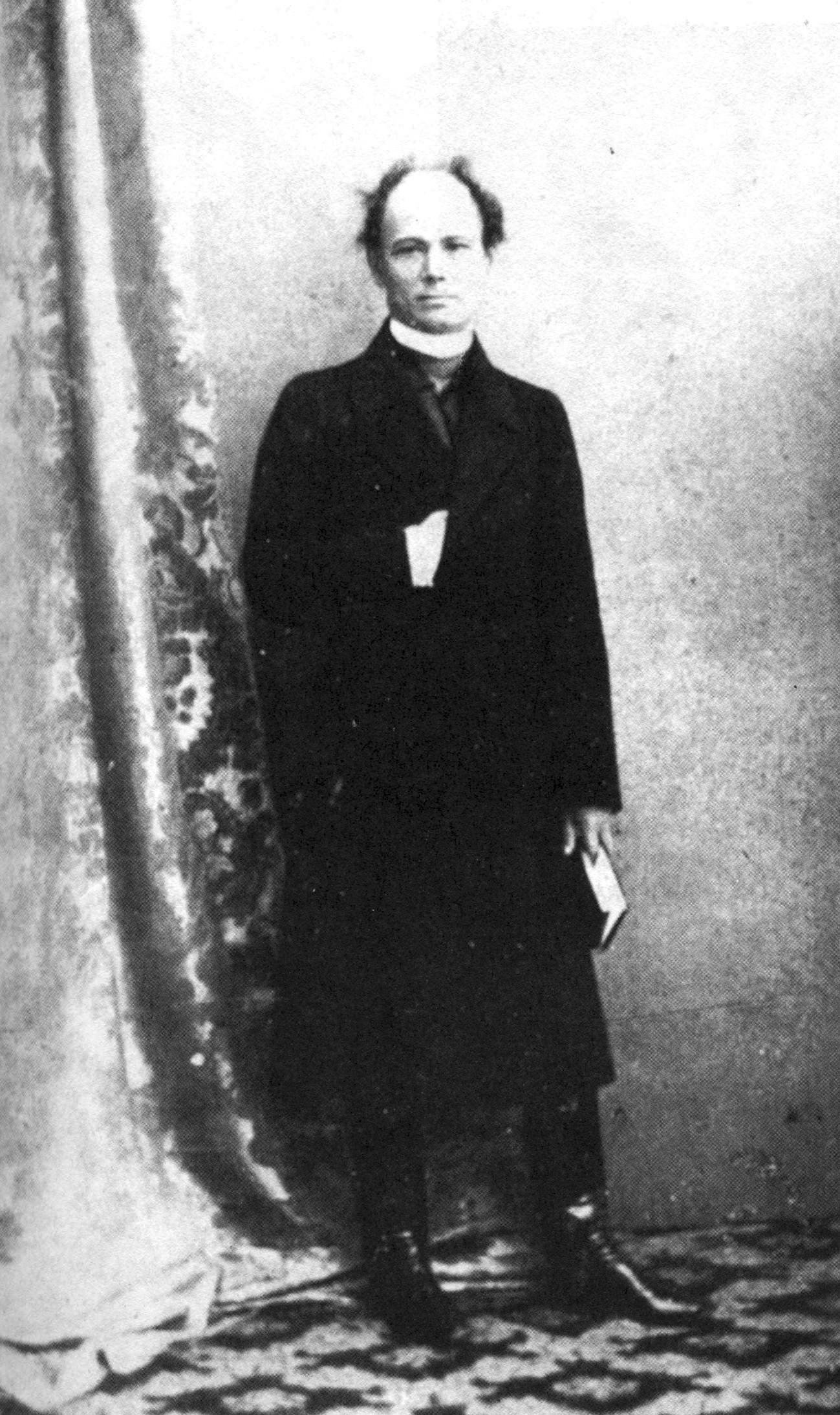
Strossmayer at a younger age

Strossmayer was born in Osijek in the Kingdom of Slavonia, then part of the Austrian Empire, to a Croatian family. His great-grandfather was an ethnic German immigrant from Styria who had married a Croatian woman. Strossmayer finished school at a Jesuit Humanitas schola gymnasium in Osijek, and then graduated theology at the Catholic seminary in Đakovo. He earned a PhD in philosophy at a high seminary in Budapest, at the age of 20.

Ordained in 1838, he worked as a vicar in Petrovaradin, before moving to Vienna in 1840 to the Augustineum and the University of Vienna, where he received another doctorate in philosophy and Canon law in 1842. In 1847, he was made the Habsburg palace chaplain (a position he would hold until 1859), and named one of the rectors of the Augustineum. On 18 November 1849, he was appointed Bishop of Đakovo, and was consecrated on 8 September 1850. At the same time, he was Apostolic Administrator of Belgrade and Smederevo in Serbia. In 1898, the pope conferred the pallium on him. He was a supporter of repairing the Schism between the Roman Catholic and Russian Orthodox churches, and worked with the Russian ecumenist Vladimir Solovyov to advocate for a reunion.

=== First Vatican Council ===
At the First Vatican Council (1869–1870), Strossmayer was one of the most notable opponents of papal infallibility, and distinguished himself as a speaker. Pope Pius IX praised Strossmayer's "remarkably good Latin." A speech in which Strossmayer defended Protestantism made a great sensation. Another speech, allegedly delivered on 2 June 1870, was also attributed to him, but was actually forged by a former Augustinian, a Mexican named José Agustín de Escudero. It was full of heresies, and denied not only papal infallibility, but also papal primacy.

On 26 December 1872, Strossmayer published the decrees of the council in his official paper. He later proclaimed his submission to the pope, as in his pastoral letter of 28 February 1881 on Sts. Cyril and Methodius, expressing his devotion to the papal see at times in extravagant language.

== Political work ==
In politics, Strossmayer was an active supporter of the People's Party, he advocated for Pan-Slavism and Yugoslavism. He started his political career in 1860, when he became member of the Imperial Council. There, he spoke against centralism and absolutism, but also opposed Hungarian demands for greater independence. He supported federalization of the Austrian Empire. After Strossmayer's criticism, Imperial government made concessions regarding the official use of the Croatian language in Croatia and Slavonia.

In 1861, Strossmayer became member of the Croatian Sabor (diet). There, he advocated union between Croatians and Hungarians within federalized Hungary. Strossmayer was the head of the Croatian parliamentary delegation that met with the Hungarian delegation in attempt to negotiate new relationship between Croatia and Hungary, but without success. In 1866, Sabor majority, led by Strossmayer, voted that Croatians should not join the Diet of Hungary. Strossmayer personally presented this decision to the emperor in Vienna. Imperial court disregarded this Croatian decision and negotiated Austro-Hungarian Compromise in 1867, whereby Croatia became part of Transleithania (Hungary). In 1868, Croatian and Hungarian member of the Diet of Hungary agreed on the Croatian–Hungarian Settlement, an arrangement Strossmayer opposed. He boycotted that session of the Diet. Later, in 1872, Strossmayer was part of the Sabor delegation that negotiated some amendments to the Settlement with Hungarians. In 1873 Strossmayer left the Sabor, and ended his political career.

In 1860, Strossmayer advocated Yugoslavism within federal Austria-Hungary. Charles Loiseau asserted that in 1866 Serbian Prince Mihailo proposed a secret plan for the unification of Serbs and Croats that had been prepared by Jovan Ristić, Prince Nicholas I of Montenegro, and Strossmayer. Strossmayer published a denial and called this a lie.

== Cultural work ==
Strossmayer used the large revenues of his diocese to found educational and art institutions. Under his direction, Augustín Theiner edited the "Vetera monumenta Slavorum meridionalium" (1863). During 1866-82, Strossmayer built a fine and splendidly ornamented Cathedral in Đakovo. He sought to win the non-Catholic Serbs to Rome by the use of the Old Slavonic liturgy.

Strossmayer was instrumental in the founding of the Yugoslav Academy of Sciences and Arts in 1866, as well as the re-establishment of the University of Zagreb in 1874. He initiated the building of the Academy Palace (completed in 1880) and set up The Strossmayer Gallery of Old Masters (1884) in Zagreb.

Strossmayer aided the creation of the printing house in Cetinje, helped found the Matica slovenska and actively supported Matica srpska, the national culture societies of the Slovenes and the Serbs, respectively.

== Personal life ==
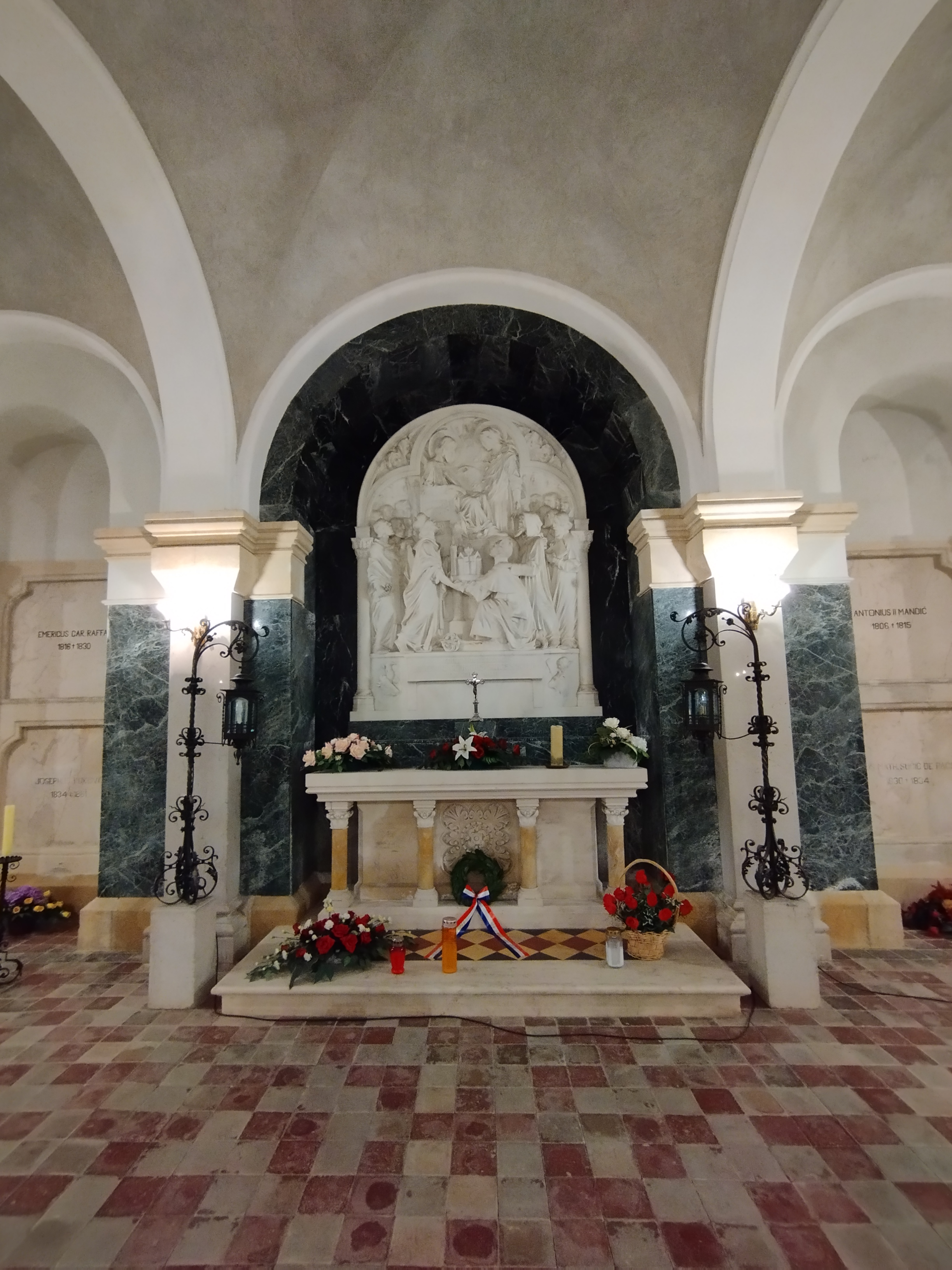
Burial site of Strossmayer in the Đakovo Cathedral krypt

Since the early days of his episcopate, he was a close friend of Franjo Rački, the most renowned Croatian historian of his time. When the Academy was founded in 1867, Strossmayer was named chief sponsor, and Rački its President. In 1894, when Rački died, Strossmayer wrote: "I lost my dearest friend... I lost a part of myself... the good half of everything I have created was his thought, his credit and his glory". Their friendship was well documented in a series of four books containing their letters, compiled by historian Ferdo Šišić.

== Legacy ==
Bishop Nikolaj Velimirović dedicated a booklet entitled Religion and Nationality in Serbia to Strossmayer: "to the memory of the great Croatian patriot Bishop Strossmayer on the centenary of his birth (1815–1915)".

In 1881, Schulzer (a Hungarian-Croatian army officer and mycologist) published a genus of fungi in the family Helotiaceae as Strossmayeria which was named in Strossmayer's honour.

Prague's Strossmayerovo náměstí, a public square on the north bank of the Vltava river, was re-named after him in the 1960s. A prominent street in central Sarajevo bears Strossmayer's name.

== Gallery ==
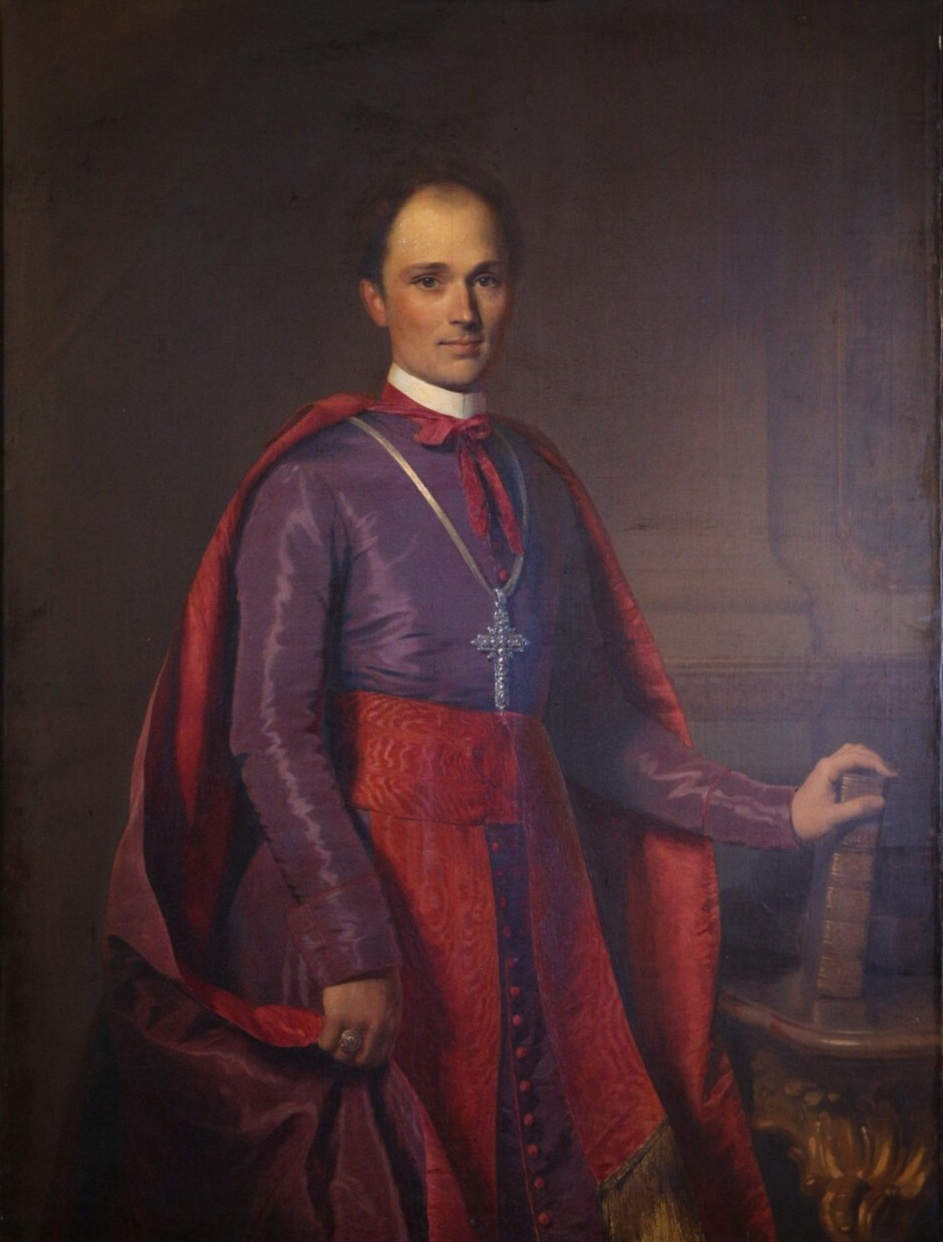
Portrait by Franz Schrotzberg (1850)

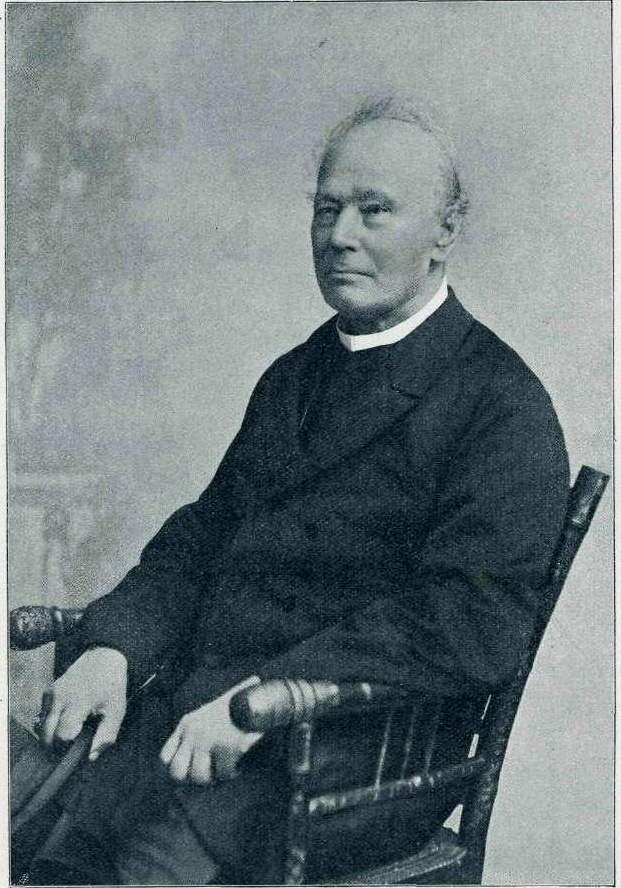
Photo from 1905

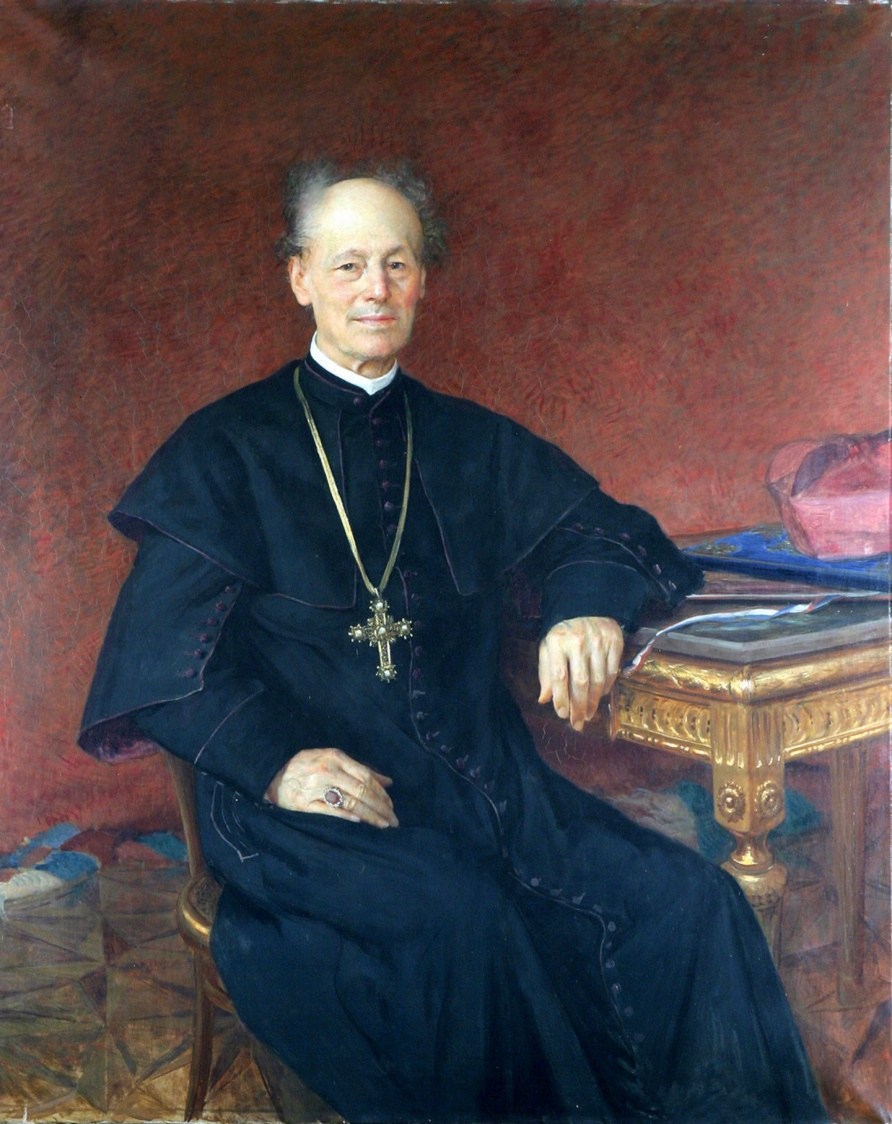
Photo

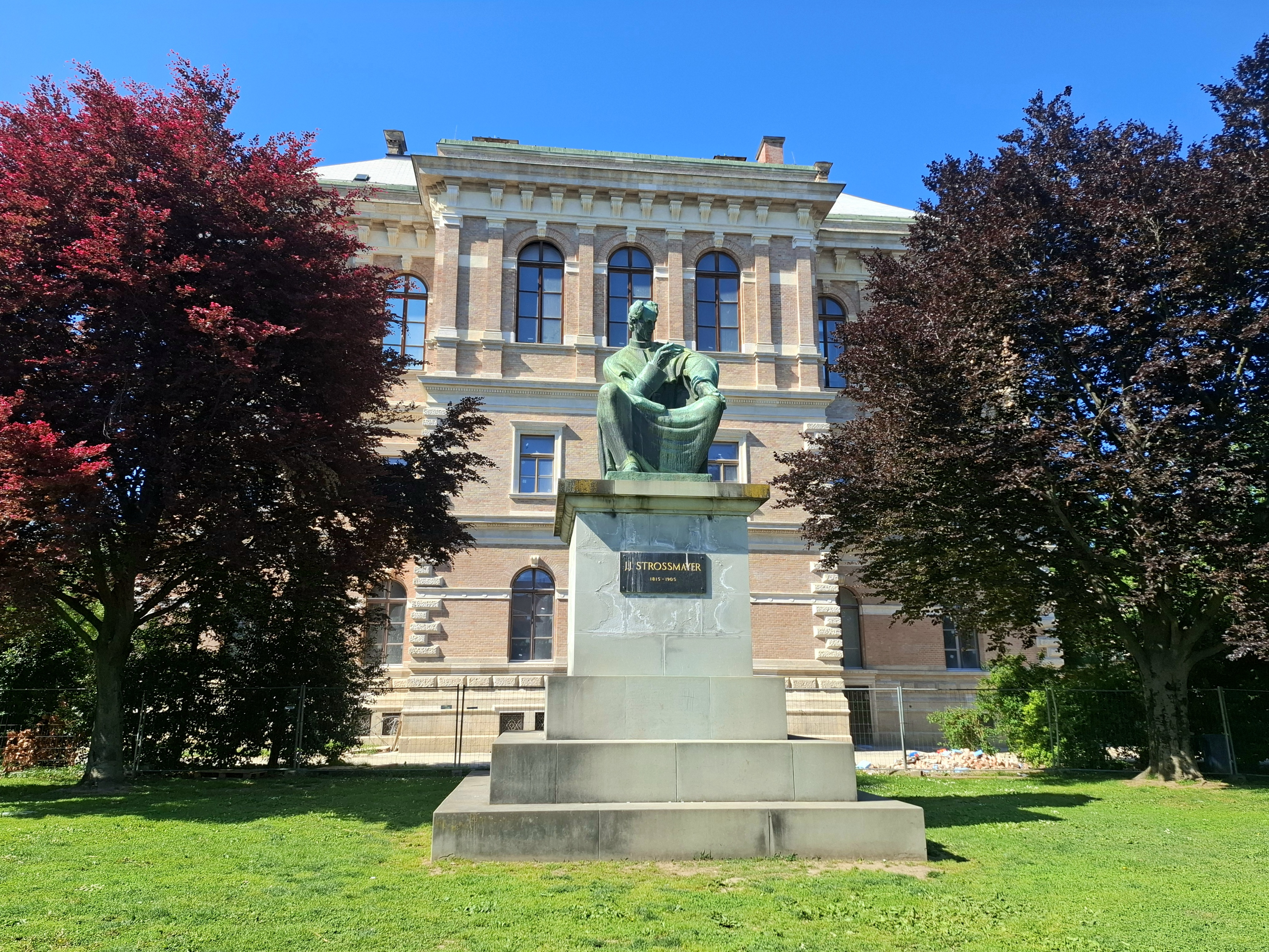
Statue of Strossmayer by Ivan Meštrović
