= Friedrich von Schmidt =

Architect

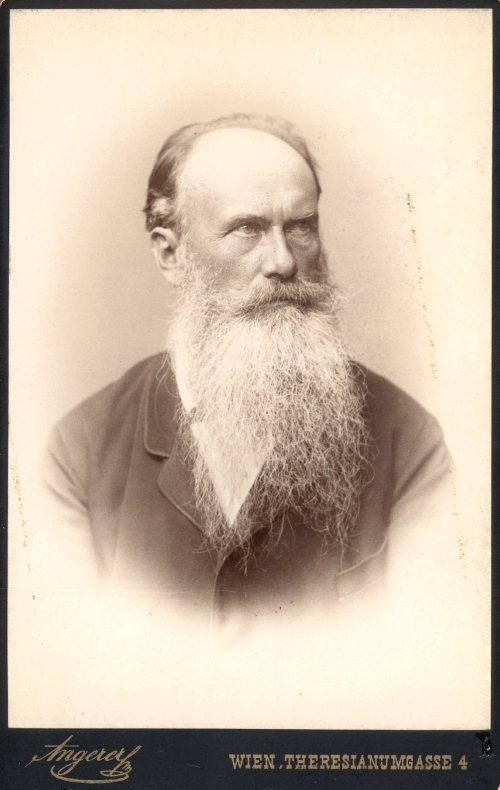
Friedrich Freiherr von Schmidt

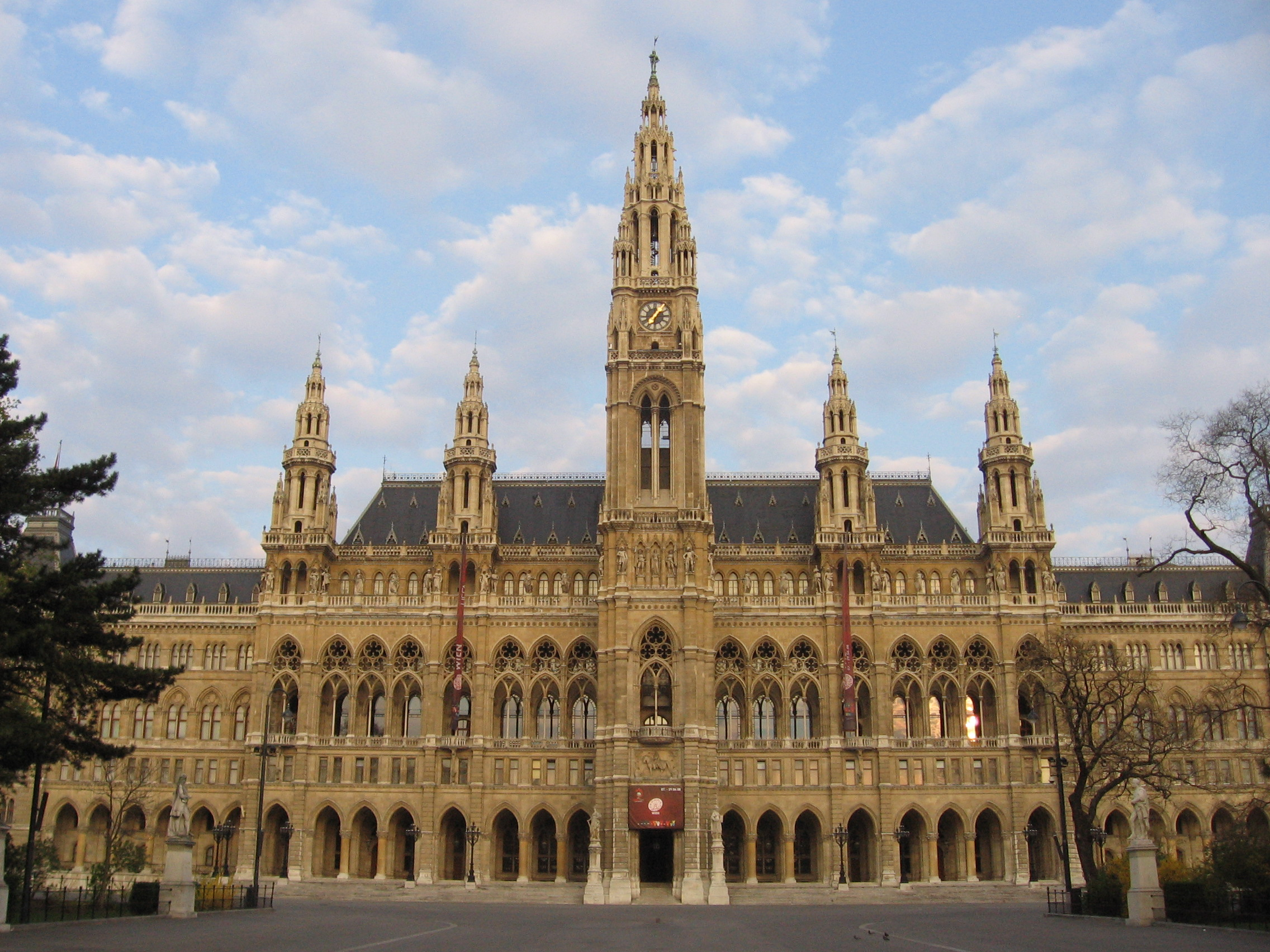
Vienna Town Hall, designed by Friedrich von Schmidt

Friedrich von Schmidt (22 October 1825 – 23 January 1891) was an Austrian architect. He worked in late 19th century Vienna.

== Life and career ==
Von Schmidt was born in Frickenhofen, Gschwend, Württemberg, Germany. After studying at the technical high school in Stuttgart under Breymann and Mauch, he became, in 1845, one of the guild workers employed in building Cologne Cathedral, on which he worked for fifteen years. Most of the working drawings for the towers were made by Schmidt and Vincenz Statz. In 1848 he attained the rank of master-workman and in 1856 passed the state examination as architect. After becoming a Catholic in 1858, he went to Milan as professor of architecture and began the restoration of the cathedral of Sant'Ambrogio. On account of the confusion caused by the war of 1859 he went to Vienna, where he was a professor at the academy and cathedral architect from 1862; in 1865 he received the title of chief architect, and in 1888 was ennobled by the emperor.

In the Gothic Revival style he built in Vienna the Church of Saint Lazarus, Saint Othmar's Church (in German: Sankt Othmar unter den Weißgerbern, literally "Saint Othmar among the White Tanners") in the 3rd district (Landstraße) and that of the Brigittines. He also built a school, the Akademisches Gymnasium, with a Gothic facade and the memorial building erected on the site of the amphitheatre that had been destroyed by fire. The last mentioned building was in Venetian Gothic. A large number of small ecclesiastical and secular buildings in Austria and Germany were designed by him. His last work was the restoration of Pécs Cathedral in Hungary. His chief fame however he gained by his restoration of St. Stephen's Cathedral, Vienna. He took down the spire and worked on its rebuilding up to 1872.

He also designed the Town Hall for Rathaus, Vienna, with a projecting middle section which has a central tower that rises free to a height of 328 ft (100 m) and is flanked by four smaller towers. A large court and six smaller ones are enclosed by the extensive building, the wings of which end in pavilions. In building the parish church in Funfhaus he even ventured to set a facade with two towers in front of an octagonal central structure with a high cupola and a corona of chapels. His motto was to unite German force with Italian freedom. He modified the tendency to height in the German Gothic by horizontal members and introduced many modifications into the old standard of the style in the hope of attaining a more agreeable general effect. He also designed Vaduz Cathedral and St. Joseph's Cathedral in Bucharest. From 1870 to 1882, he worked as chief architect on the neoromanesque Cathedral of St. Peter and St. Paul in Đakovo as successor of Carl Roesner.

He was teacher and model to many younger architects, including Friedrich Grünanger, Frigyes Schulek, Imre Steindl, and Karl Troll. A bronze statue of him has been placed before the town-hall of Vienna. His son Heinrich was overseer at the building of the cathedral of Frankfurt and afterwards professor of medieval architecture in Munich.

He died in Vienna, aged 65.
