= Curic =

Curic, Ćurić, Čurić, or Curić is a South Slavic surname. Notable people with the surname include:

- Edin Ćurić, Bosnian football player
- Ivan Ćurić (disambiguation), multiple people
  - Ivan Ćurić (bishop) (born 1964), Croatian Roman Catholic prelate
  - Ivan Ćurić (footballer) (born 1987), Croatian footballer
- Kemal Curić, Bosnian automobile designer
- Vjekoslav Ćurić, Bosnian Croat priest and humanitarian
