= Name of Mary Church =

Church in Novi Sad, Serbia

- Црква имена Маријиног; Crkva imena Marijinog
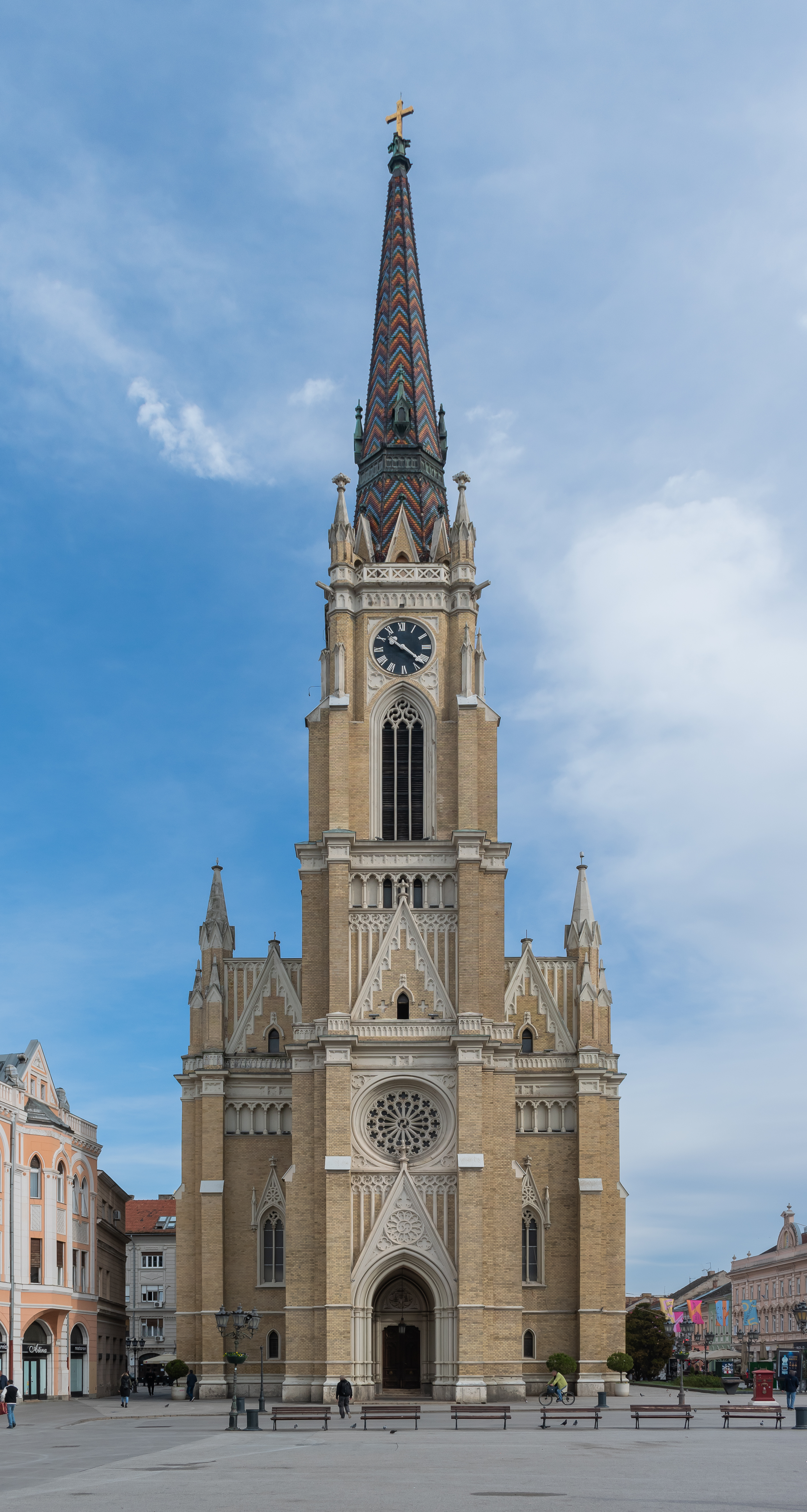
- Name of Mary Church in Novi Sad, 2023

Religion
- Affiliation: Roman Catholic Church
- Rite: Latin
- Ecclesiastical or organisational status: parish church
- Patron: Most Holy Name of the Blessed Virgin Mary
- Status: active

Location
- Municipality: Novi Sad
- Interactive map of Name of Mary Church
- Coordinates: 45.255632°N 19.845654°E

Architecture
- Architect: György Molnár
- Style: Gothic Revival
- General contractor: Stefan Gusek; Karl Lerer
- Groundbreaking: 1892
- Completed: 1894

Specifications
- Length: 52.5 metres (172 ft)
- Width: 21.7 metres (71 ft)
- Height (max): 72 metres (236 ft)

The Name of Mary Church (Serbian: Црква имена Маријиног, romanized: Crkva imena Marijinog; Hungarian: Mária Neve katolikus templom) is a Roman Catholic church in Novi Sad, Serbia, dedicated to the feast of the Most Holy Name of the Blessed Virgin Mary. Commonly known as the Cathedral (although Novi Sad belongs to the Diocese of Subotica, whose cathedral is located in Subotica), it is the largest church in Novi Sad, located on the central Freedom Square.

== History ==
After the 1699 Treaty of Karlowitz, Novi Sad became part of the Habsburg monarchy. The local Catholic parish was established in 1702, and the original church was built in 1719 on the same location as today's church. It was dedicated to Mary Help of Christians in the memory of the Holy League success in the Battle of Vienna. Later, it was renamed the Name of Mary Church. This original church was destroyed in 1742. A new, second church was built on the same location. Catholic Archbishop of Kalocsa Patacsich Gábor dedicated this new church in 1742. This, second church, was heavily damaged in the bombing during the Hungarian Revolution of 1848 and its bell-tower was destroyed. It was later partially reconstructed.

In 1891, the city council made a decision to demolish the old church, and to build a new one on the same location. Hungarian architect György Molnár designed the church in 1892 for free. The old church was demolished the same year, and the new one started, with groundbreaking occurring on October 4. The main construction was finished in November 1893. The 72-metre bell-tower with the golden cross was finished in October 1894.

In 1904, the roof of the church burned down due to a fire. It was quickly rebuilt by donations from local worshipers.

== Architecture ==
The church is a three-nave building, with neo-Gothic arches. There are twenty stained glasses depicting saints and church fathers. The church has mechanical pipe organ with 24 registers.

The church has four altars. The main one in the apse is made of the carved wood from Tyrol, the windows with stained glass from Budapest and the roof tiles were made of Zsolnay ceramics. The church has four confessionals and a marble baptistry. It is the third tallest church in Bačka region after the Church of Saint Virgin Mary in Bačka Topola and Church of Saint Stephan in Sombor, dominating the city center of Novi Sad.

== Gallery ==
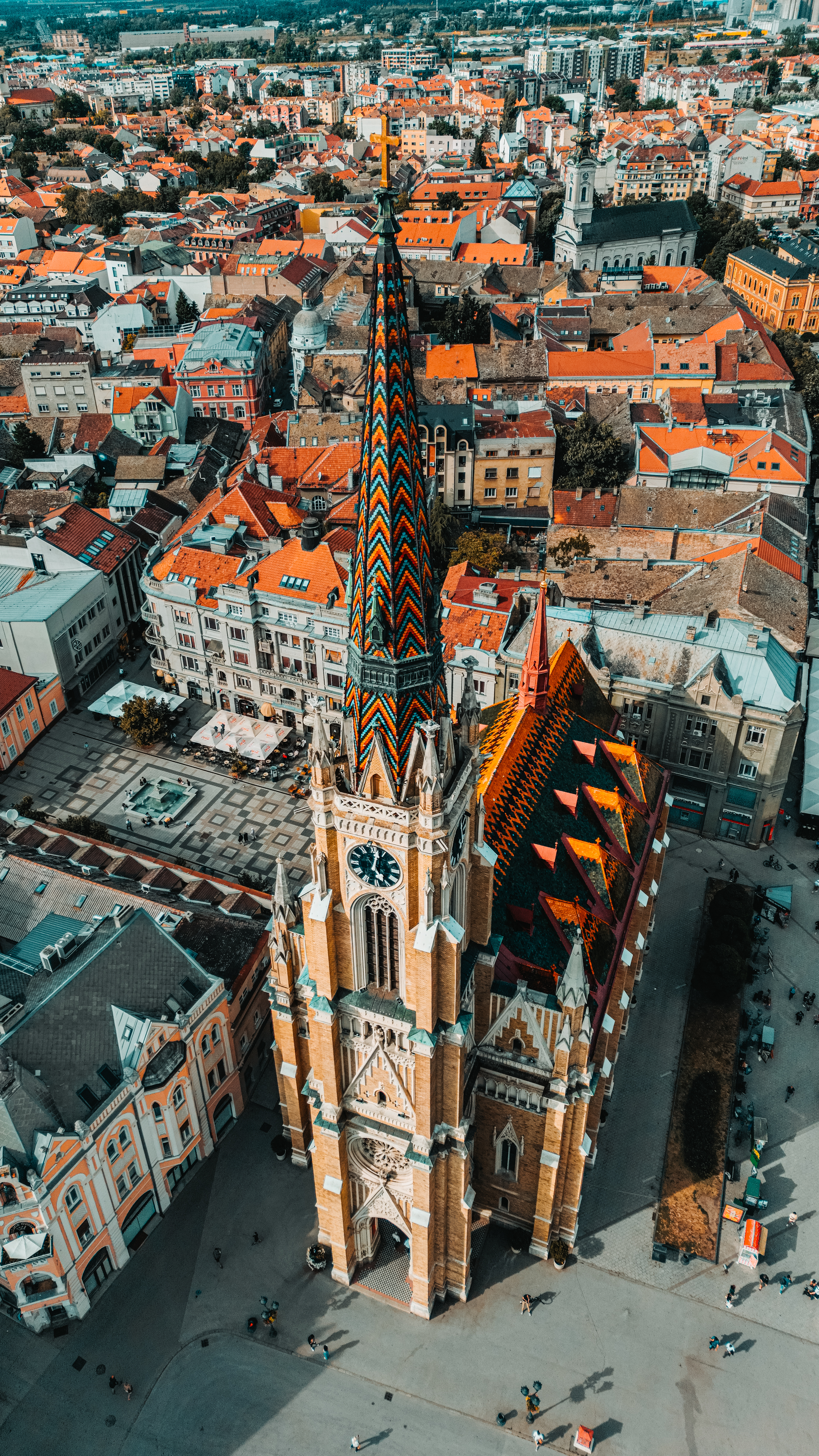
Aerial view

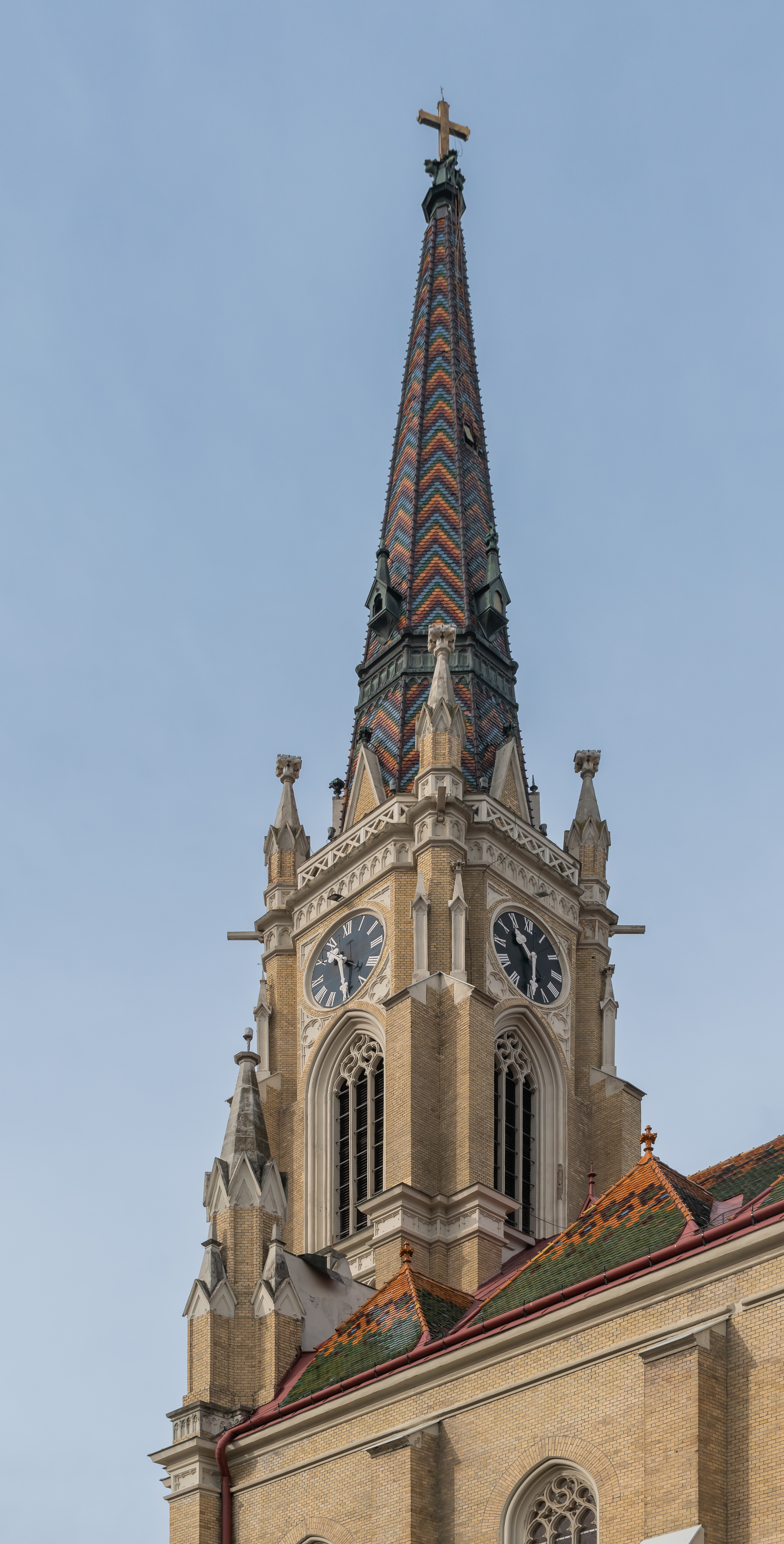
Tower bell

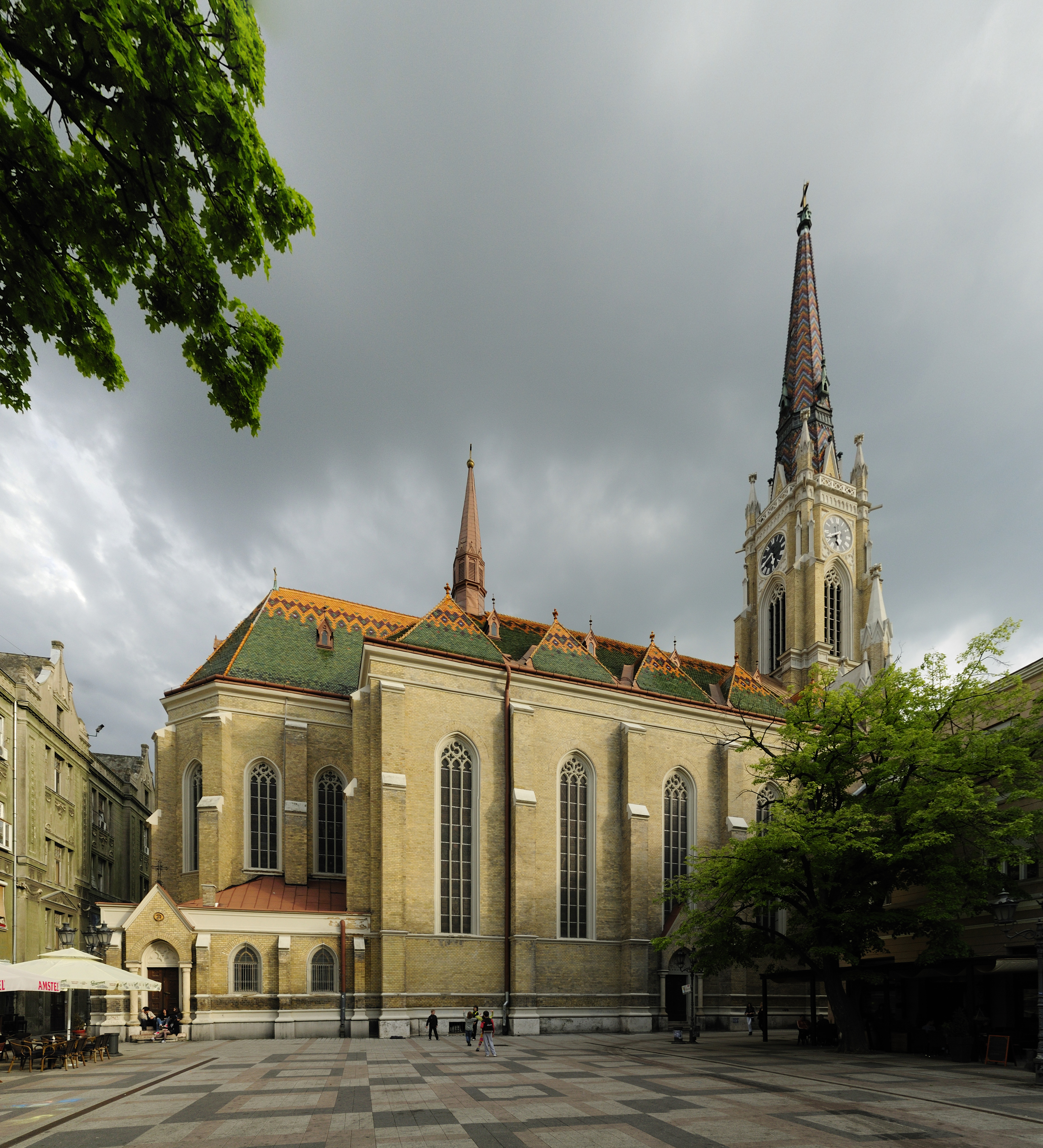
Side view

== See also ==
- Religious architecture in Novi Sad
- Catholic Church in Serbia
