= Slavko Večerin =

Serbian Roman Catholic prelate (1957–2022)

Alojzije Slavko Večerin
- Diocesan Bishop of Roman Catholic Diocese of Subotica
- Church: Roman Catholic Church
- Appointed: 8 September 2020
- Term ended: 26 August 2022
- Predecessor: János Pénzes
- Successor: Ferenc Fazekas
- Previous post: Vicar General of Diocese of Subotica (2005–2020)

Orders
- Ordination: 14 August 1983 (Priest)
- Consecration: 14 November 2020 (Bishop) by Bishop László Német

Personal details
- Born: Alojzije Slavko Večerin; 6 June 1957 Palić, SR Serbia, FPR Yugoslavia
- Died: 26 August 2022 (aged 65) Kikinda, Serbia
- Education: University of Zagreb
- Motto: Per Christum et cum Christo et in Christo

Bishop Alojzije Slavko Večerin (Serbian Cyrillic: Славко Вечерин; 6 June 1957 – 26 August 2022) was a Serbian Roman Catholic prelate who served as the diocesan bishop of the Diocese of Subotica in Serbia from 8 September 2020 until his death. He was a member of the International Bishops' Conference of Saints Cyril and Methodius.

== Education ==
Bishop Večerin was born into a Vojvodina Croats Roman Catholic family in Palić (town located in the city of Subotica).

After graduation from the primary school in his native town and the classical gymnasium in Subotica in 1976, he consequently joined the Archdiocesan Theological Seminary in Zagreb and the Theological Faculty at the University of Zagreb, where he studied from 1976 until 1983, and was ordained as priest on 14 August 1983 for his native Diocese of Subotica, after completed his philosophical and theological studies.

== Later career ==
After his ordination Fr. Večerin for a short time served as an assistant priest in the parish of the Holy Trinity in Sombor (1983–1985), until in the summer of 1985 he was appointed administrator of the parish of St. Paul in Bač. Then, in 1991, he was transferred to Subotica, where he served as a spiritual director in the Minor Seminary Paulinum and archivist of the Episcopal Ordinariate. From 1994 to 2006, he served as secretary of the Diocese of Subotica. At the same time he served as the parish priest in the parish of St. Peter and Paul in Bajmok (1998–2008), and then from 2011 to 2016 in the parish of Mary Mother of the Church in Subotica, and at the same time he was the rector of the Marian shrine Bunarić. Since 2016 until 2020, he was the pastor of the parish of the Exaltation of the Holy Cross in Sombor.

He was the Vicar General of the Diocese of Subotica since 2005 until 2020 and was a member of the Liturgical Council of the International Bishops' Conference of Saints Cyril and Methodius from 1999 to 2009.

== Prelate ==
On 8 September 2020, he was appointed by Pope Francis as third diocesan bishop of Subotica. On 14 November 2020, he was consecrated as bishop by Bishop László Német and other prelates of the Roman Catholic Church in the Cathedral of St. Theresa of Avila in Subotica.

Catholic Church titles
Preceded by János Pénzes	Diocesan Bishop of Subotica; 2020–2022	Succeeded by Ferenc Fazekas
