= Ćurčić =

Ćurčić (Serbian Cyrillic: Ћурчић, pronounced [tɕǔːrtʃitɕ, -ǔrtʃiː-]) is a Serbian and Croatian surname. It may refer to:

- Đorđe Ćurčić (basketball, born 2004), Serbian basketball player
- Đorđe Ćurčić (basketball, born 2005), Serbian basketball player
- Miroslav Ćurčić (born 1962), Serbian former football player
- Saša Ćurčić (born 1972), Serbian former football midfielder
- Radovan Ćurčić (born 1972), Serbian football manager and former player
- Radisav Ćurčić (born 1965), Serbian-Israeli basketball player, 1999 Israeli Basketball Premier League MVP

== See also ==
- Ćurić
