= Church of Saint Vincent Pallotti, Vinkovci =

Parish Church of Saint Vincent Pallotti
- Župna crkva svetog Vinka Pallottija
- 45.278201°N 18.799565°E
- Location: Trg sv. Vinka Pallottija 1, Vinkovci
- Country: Croatia
- Denomination: Roman Catholic

History
- Status: Parish church

Architecture
- Functional status: Active
- Architect: Srećko Lovrinčević
- Groundbreaking: 1985
- Completed: 1989

Administration
- Metropolis: Metropolis of Đakovo-Osijek
- Archdiocese: Archdiocese of Đakovo-Osijek
- Parish: Parish of Saint Vincent Pallotti - Vinkovci 4

The Church of Saint Vincent Pallotti (Croatian: Crkva svetog Vinka Pallottija) is a Roman Catholic church in Vinkovci, Croatia.

== History ==
The church was built from 1985 till 1989.

It was damaged by an artillery shell on 15 September 1991, during the Croatian War of Independence, but later it was renovated.
