= Ivan Ćurić =

Ivan Ćurić may refer to:

- Ivan Ćurić (bishop) (born 1964), Croatian Roman Catholic prelate
- Ivan Ćurić (footballer) (born 1987), Croatian footballer
