= Roman Catholic Diocese of Požega =

Roman Catholic diocese in Croatia

Coordinates: 45.3329°N 17.6783°E

Diocese of Požega Dioecesis Posegana Požeška biskupija

Catholic
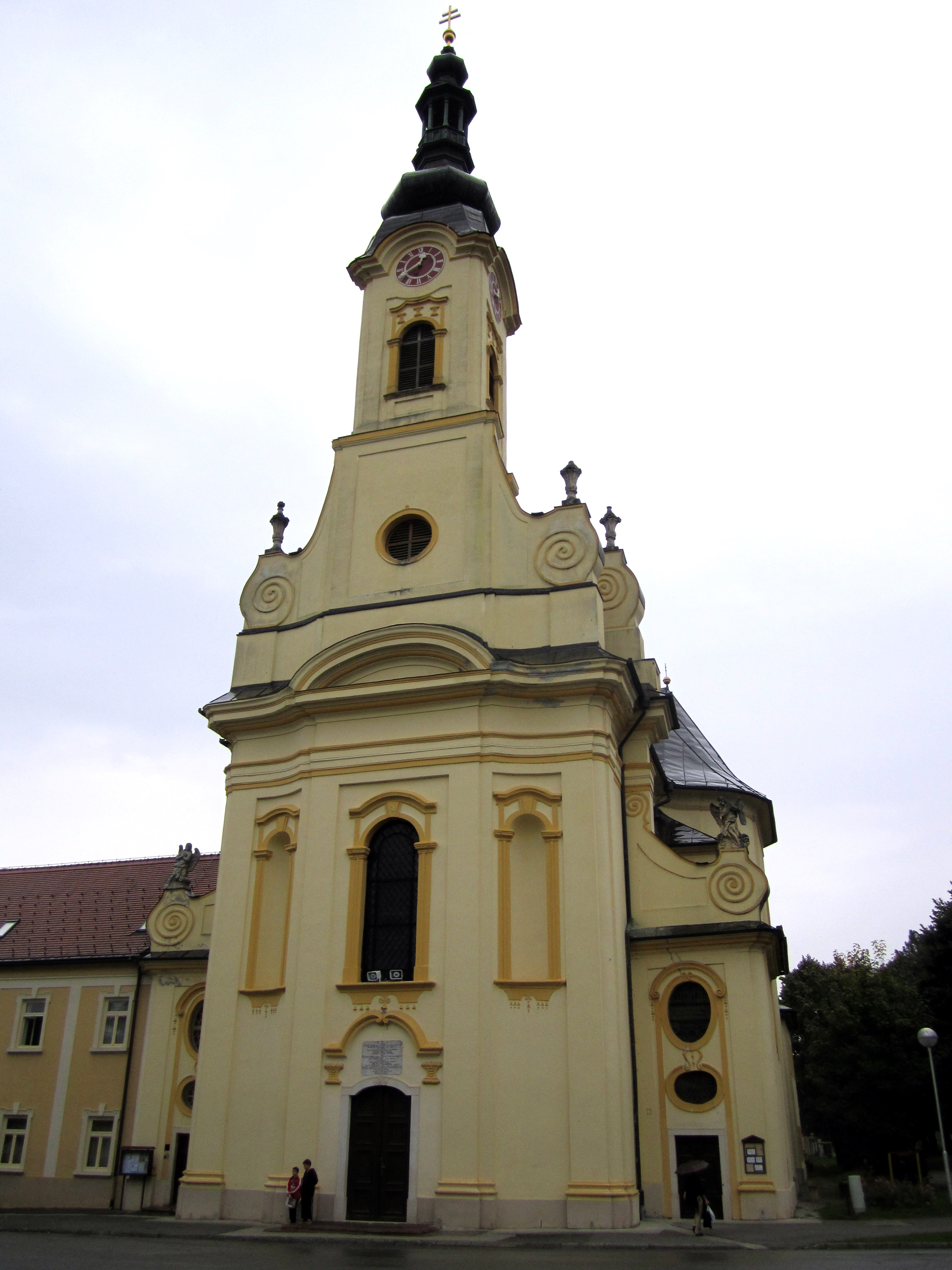
- Požega Cathedral

Location
- Country: Croatia
- Ecclesiastical province: Đakovo-Osijek
- Metropolitan: Archdiocese of Đakovo–Osijek

Statistics
- Area: 6,931 km^{2} (2,676 sq mi)
- Population: Total; Catholics: (as of 2013); 286,285; 254,937 (89.1%)

Information
- Denomination: Catholic
- Sui iuris church: Latin Church
- Rite: Roman Rite
- Established: 5 July 1997
- Cathedral: Cathedral of St. Theresa of Ávila
- Patron saint: Saint Lawrence

Current leadership
- Pope: Leo XIV
- Bishop: Ivo Martinović Bishop of Požega
- Metropolitan Archbishop: Đuro Hranić Archbishop of Đakovo-Osijek
- Bishops emeritus: Antun Škvorčević

Map

Website
- pozega.hbk.hr

The Diocese of Požega (Croatian: Požeška biskupija; Latin: Dioecesis Posegana) is a Latin ecclesiastical territory or diocese of the Catholic Church in the Slavonia region of Croatia. The diocese is centred in the city of Požega. It was first erected in 1997 after being split from the Archdiocese of Zagreb. The archdiocese had grown too large to effectively serve its faithful.

Požega was selected as the seat of diocese because of its historic tradition, as an urban centre since the 13th century. It was also the site of the first institution of higher education in Slavonia - the Jesuit Academy established in 1761.

The diocese covers the territory of western Slavonia as well as parts of Podravina (Virovitica) and Posavina (Nova Gradiška). This region suffered greatly during the Croatian War of Independence, and the need for the church to help in the recovery was another reason for the diocese's creation. Many church holdings were destroyed during the course of the war, and the recovery is still an ongoing process.

The diocese has 270,000 faithful, who are organized into the deaneries of Našice, Nova Gradiška, Nova Kapela, Pakrac, Požega and Virovitica with a total of 85 parishes.

Currently, Bishop Antun Škvorčević is head of the diocese. The diocesan cathedral is Saint Teresa of Ávila Cathedral.

On June 18, 2008, the diocese was shifted from suffragan to the Archdiocese of Zagreb, to a suffragan of the Archdiocese of Djakovo-Osijek

== Ordinaries ==
- Antun Škvorčević (5 July 1997 — 11 March 2024)
- Ivo Martinović, T.O.R. (since 11 March 2024)
