= Đuro Hranić =

Archbishop Đuro Hranić
- Archbishop of Ðakovo-Osijek
- Church: Roman Catholic Church
- Archdiocese: Roman Catholic Archdiocese of Đakovo-Osijek
- Province: Đakovo-Osijek
- See: Đakovo
- Appointed: 18 April 2013
- Predecessor: Marin Srakić

Orders
- Ordination: 29 June 1986
- Consecration: 22 September 2001 by Marin Srakić

Personal details
- Born: Đuro Hranić; 20 March 1961 (age 65) Cerić, SR Croatia, SFR Yugoslavia (modern Croatia)
- Denomination: Roman Catholic
- Education: University of Osijek; Pontifical Gregorian University
- Motto: Izvezi na pučinu Put out into deep water (Luke 5:4)
- Coat of arms: Đuro Hranić's coat of arms

Ordination history of Đuro Hranić
History
Priestly ordination
- Ordained by: Ćiril kos
Episcopal consecration
- Consecrated by: Marin Srakić
Episcopal succession
Bishops consecrated by Đuro Hranić as principal consecrator
- Ivan Ćurić: 22. Travnja 2019.
- Ferenc Fazekas: 11. studenog 2023.
- Ivo Martinović: 8. lipnja 2024.

Đuro Hranić (born 20 March 1961) is a Croatian theologian serving as the Archbishop of Ðakovo-Osijek.

== Early life and education ==
Đuro Hranić was born in a small village of Cerić near Vinkovci on 20 March 1961 to Stjepan and Eva Hranić. He finished primary school in Cerić, after which he attended first two classes of gymnasium in Osijek, and last two at the Diocesan Gymnasium of Josip Juraj Strossmayer in Đakovo (1975–1979). Hranić graduated in 1986 in philosophy and theology at the Đakovo Catholic Theological Faculty of the University of Osijek. He gained his doctorate in dogmatic theology from the Pontifical Gregorian University in 1993.

== Career ==
Đuro Hranić was ordained a priest of the Roman Catholic Archdiocese of Đakovo-Osijek on 29 June 1986. He served as parish vicar in Osijek (1986–1987), prefect of Đakovo seminary (1993–1996), professor of dogmatic theology at the Đakovo Catholic Theological Faculty (since 1993), assistant of laity students at the same Faculty (1993–1998), Deputy Head of Chair of Theology (since 1997), assistant professor at the Department of Dogmatic Theology at the Catholic Theological Faculty of the University of Zagreb for the needs of the regional studies in Đakovo (since 2000), Secretary General of the Second Synod of Roman Catholic Archdiocese of Đakovo-Osijek (since 1998), member of the Presbyterian Council of the same (since 1994), member of the Council of consultors of the Archdiocese of Đakovo-Osijek (since 2000), member of the Episcopal Commission for Laity of the Croatian Bishops' Conference, and editor in chief of the diocesan monthly Vjesnik of Archdiocese of Đakovo-Osijek (since 1994).

On 5 July 2001, Pope John Paul II appointed him to the position of Auxiliary bishop, and gave him title of Titular Bishop of Gaudiabe. He was ordained for the auxiliary bishop on 22 September 2001 in Đakovo Cathedral. On 18 April 2013, Pope Francis appointed him to the position of the Archbishop of Đakovo-Osijek. On 29 June 2013, Hranić received the archbishop's pallium in Rome from the Pope Francis. He celebrated his first Mass as Archbishop on 6 July 2013 in Đakovo Cathedral. He is the first Croatian Archbishop appointed by Pope Francis.

== Reaction on 2013 Anti-Cyrillic protests ==
Archbishop Hranić was one of very few members of the clergy who explicitly opposed Anti-Cyrillic protests against the application of bilingualism in Vukovar that occurred in late 2013, calling for mutual respect and love. On 18 November 2013, on Vukovar Remembrance Day, which is held to commemorate victims from the Battle of Vukovar, archbishop Hranić stated in his homily:

"This city was built on the sacrifice of love, and destructed by the cries of hatred. It is being re-born and re-built on the remains of the fallen human words and deeds. Therefore, the words, and with the words letters, have its past and its present in this city. Therefore, one plate contains two different histories; on one plate two different visions of the present; those are on one panel two different futures. There is only one Vukovar! However, there is place for everyone in this city. If it wasn't so, then the sacrifice that was taken by our deceased would be pointless. It's not just about letters and words, but also about the soul of Vukovar which is wounded. Devastated walls and facades can be repaired even by different political interests, or soul; it cannot be repaired by interest, but only by love. I call everyone to the conversion based on love which would deep within us uproot and destroy all that leads to thinking and acting against each other. It can all become moot: money, power, and books in which different truth about us is written, but love remains. She is the one that is, by the power of the Holy Spirit, the resurrection of The One who gave his life on Cross for friends and enemies: for the redemption of their lives! This Christian love is so great that there is enough of it for everyone in Croatia. It is the sole foundation of our future! With that love we thank those because of whom we continue to believe that it is worth it to live every day as brothers and sisters, as a big family and the community of believers. We want to leave from this place with a reinvigorated love. We do not want to just talk about it, dishonor it with cheap promises and hypocrisy, but we want to weave love in all aspects of our life, incorporate it in empathy - feel for each other, solidarity, integrity and honesty of our work, dedication and sincerity of our relations. Let it be recognized that Christ is the way that we want to follow and that His love is our basic platform on which we want to build a better and more humane world in which we experience the germination and growth of God's kingdom of truth, life, justice, love and peace."
