= János Pénzes =

- Bishop Emeritus of Subotica
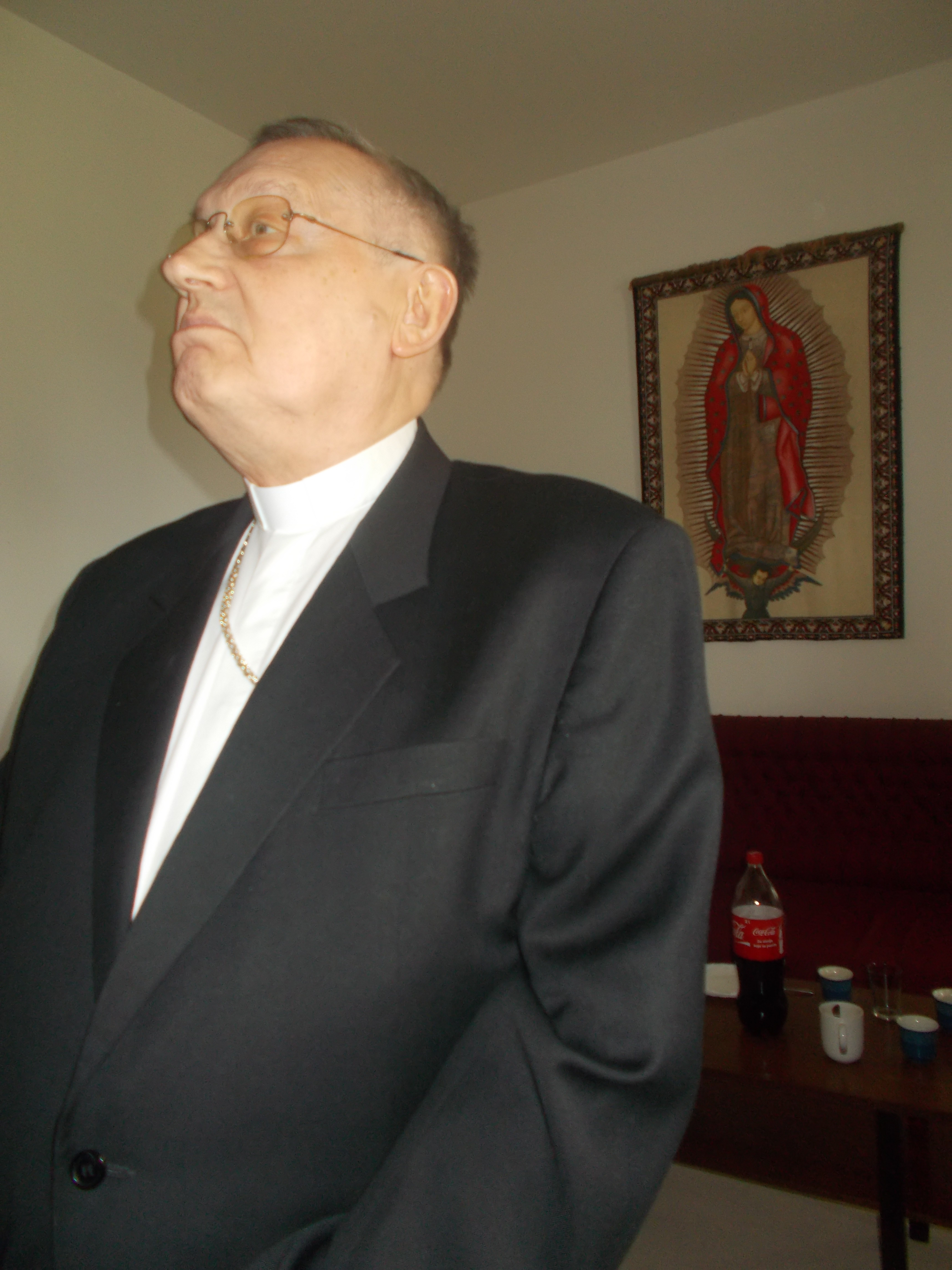
- Church: Catholic Church
- Diocese: Diocese of Subotica
- In office: 25 April 1989 – 8 September 2020
- Predecessor: Matiša Zvekanović
- Successor: Slavko Večerin

Orders
- Ordination: 29 June 1968
- Consecration: 18 June 1989 by Gabriel Montalvo Higuera

Personal details
- Born: 10 August 1943 (age 83) Bajmok, Bács-Bodrog County, Kingdom of Hungary
- Coat of arms

János Pénzes (Hungarian pronunciation: [ˈjaːnoʃ ˈpeːnzɛʃ]; born 10 August 1943 in Bajmok, (Kingdom of Yugoslavia ) was the Hungarian-born Roman Catholic Emeritus Bishop of Subotica between 1989 and 2020.

On 29 June 1968, Pénzes was ordained a priest. On 25 April 1989, Pope John Paul II appointed him bishop of Subotica. On 18 June 1989, he was ordained bishop by Archbishop Gabriel Montalvo Higuera.

He retired on 8 September 2020.
