= Antun Škvorčević =

Croatian bishop

Msgr. Antun Škvorčević
- Diocese of Požega
- Archdiocese: Roman Catholic Diocese of Požega
- Province: Požega
- See: Požega
- Appointed: 5 July 1997
- Term ended: 11 March 2024
- Predecessor: new creation
- Successor: Ivo Martinović

Orders
- Ordination: 25 June 1972
- Consecration: 16 July 1992 by Franjo Kuharić

Personal details
- Born: Antun Škvorčević; 8 May 1947 (age 79) Davor, SR Croatia, SFR Yugoslavia (modern Croatia)
- Denomination: Roman Catholic
- Education: University of Zagreb; Pontifical Gregorian University; Pontifical Institute of Sacred Liturgy
- Motto: Christus hodie et in saecula Krist danas i uvijeke Christ today and forever
- Coat of arms

Antun Škvorčević (born 8 May 1947) is a Croatian Roman Catholic prelate, who served as a diocesan bishop of the Roman Catholic Diocese of Požega since 1997 until 2024.

== Early life and education ==
Antun Škvorčević was born in a small village of Davor on 8 May 1947 to Ivan and Ljubičica Škvorčević.

He enrolled in primary school in Davor, and Zagreb, eventually graduating in Slavonski Brod, after which he attended high school (Classical catholic gymnasium) for future priests on Šalata in Zagreb. Škvorčević graduated from Zagreb Catholic Theological Faculty, where he also gained his master's degree, after which he went to Rome for additional specialization. In 1981 he gained his doctorate in theology at the Pontifical Gregorian University. In addition, he graduated liturgy from the Pontifical Institute of Sacred Liturgy.

== Career ==
Antun Škvorčević was ordered for a priest of the Archdiocese of Zagreb on 25 June 1972. After ordination, he worked as a chaplain in the parish of St. Joseph in Zagreb (1972–1976), lecturer at the Zagreb Catholic Theological Faculty and its institutes (since 1982), Head of the Catechetical Institute of Catholic Theology of the University of Zagreb (1991–1999), and member of the Quorum prebendarian main church in Zagreb (appointed in 1987).

on 3 May 1992, Pope John Paul II appointed him titular bishop of Editania and auxiliary bishop of the Roman Catholic Diocese of Đakovo-Srijem or Bosna. He was ordained a bishop on July 16 of the same year in the cathedral in Đakovo.

On 5 July 1997, Pope John Paul II appointed him Bishop of, at the time, newly founded Diocese of Požega. And he was enthroned on September 27, 1997.
