= Požega Cathedral =

Cathedral in Požega, Croatia

Coordinates: 45°19′58.9″N 17°40′43″E

- Saint Teresa of Ávila Cathedral
- Katedrala sv. Terezije Avilske
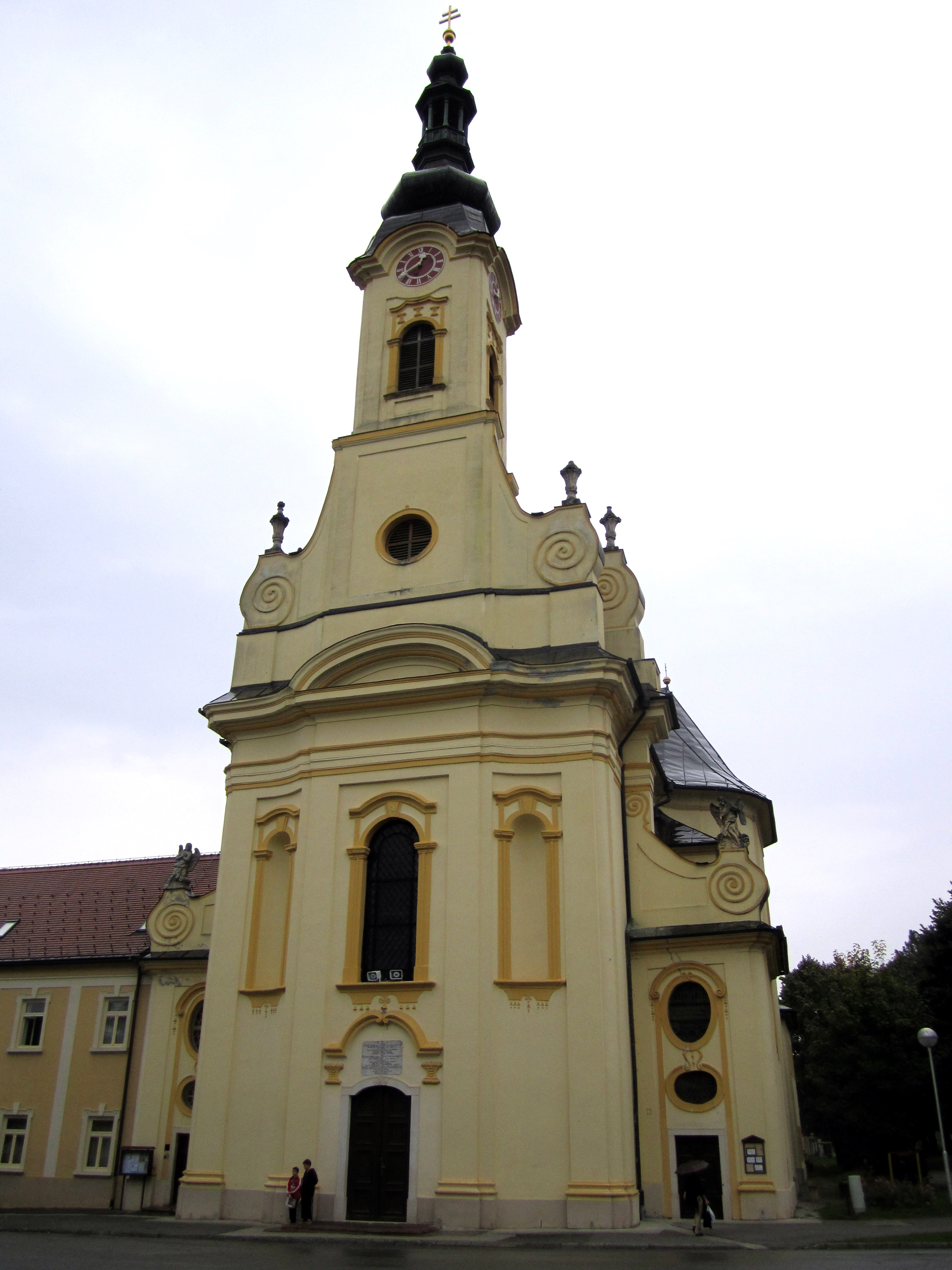
- Location: Požega
- Country: Croatia
- Denomination: Roman Catholic

History
- Status: Cathedral

Architecture
- Functional status: Active
- Style: Baroque
- Years built: 7 years
- Groundbreaking: June 28, 1756
- Completed: July 24, 1763

Administration
- Archdiocese: Požega

Saint Teresa of Ávila Cathedral is a cathedral in Požega, Croatia, and the seat of the Požega diocese. Located near Požega city center and at the foot of the hill where a medieval fortress once stood, this cathedral is a beautiful example of Baroque architecture.

== Construction ==
The cathedral building was funded by Franjo Thauszy, Zagreb bishop, with 80,000 forints that were originally intended for repairs of the Požega fortress, owned by bishop Thauszy at the time. The project was endorsed by empress Maria Theresa on 11 July 1754 and building started on 28 June 1756. The construction took seven years and bishop Thauszy consecrated the new church on 24 July 1763.

There is no record of the craftsman who has actually built the cathedral. It is only known that the blueprints were supplied by empress Maria Teresa herself.

The original tower was toppled by a storm in 1926 and had to be replaced by a new, 63 meters tall tower.

== Decoration ==
The interior of the Požega cathedral is decorated in playful baroque and rococo style. The interior is dominated by main altar of St. Teresa of Ávila, gift of bishop Franjo Thauszy, presented on the occasion of the consecration of the church. Among other altars in the cathedral, the altar of St. John of Nepomuk and the altar of St. Michael the Archangel are especially noteworthy. The former was a gift of Croatian viceroy Franjo Nádasdy, and the latter of Požega-born, Kutjevo parish priest Josip Maurović.

Furthermore, there is a beautiful pulpit - also a gift from bishop Thauszy, and rococo carved oak pews. Cathedral organ was built by Josip Brandl factory in Maribor and put in its place in 1900.

By the end of the 19th century, six octagonal stained-glass windows have been installed.

== Paintings ==
Interior of the Požega cathedral is also decorated by wall paintings painted by famous Croatian painters Celestin Medović and Oton Iveković in 1898 and 1899. Trinity painting above the main altar has been painted by two of them together, while on the ceiling of the apse there is painting of St. Teresa by Medović.

Other works by Medović in the cathedral are: Evangelists Matthew and Mark - on the ceiling of the main nave, Jesus on the Mount of Olives - on the ceiling of the south nave, and St. Cyril - in the main nave.

Iveković has painted Evangelists Luke and John - on the ceiling of the main nave, St. Methodius - in the main nave, Annunciation - in the south nave, and St. Cecilia - on the ceiling above the quire.

== Sources ==
- Katedrala sv. Terezije Avilske (in Croatian)
