= Roman Catholic Diocese of Subotica =

Roman Catholic diocese in Serbia

Diocese of Subotica Dioecesis Suboticanus Szabadkai Egyházmegye Subotička biskupija Суботичка бискупија

Catholic
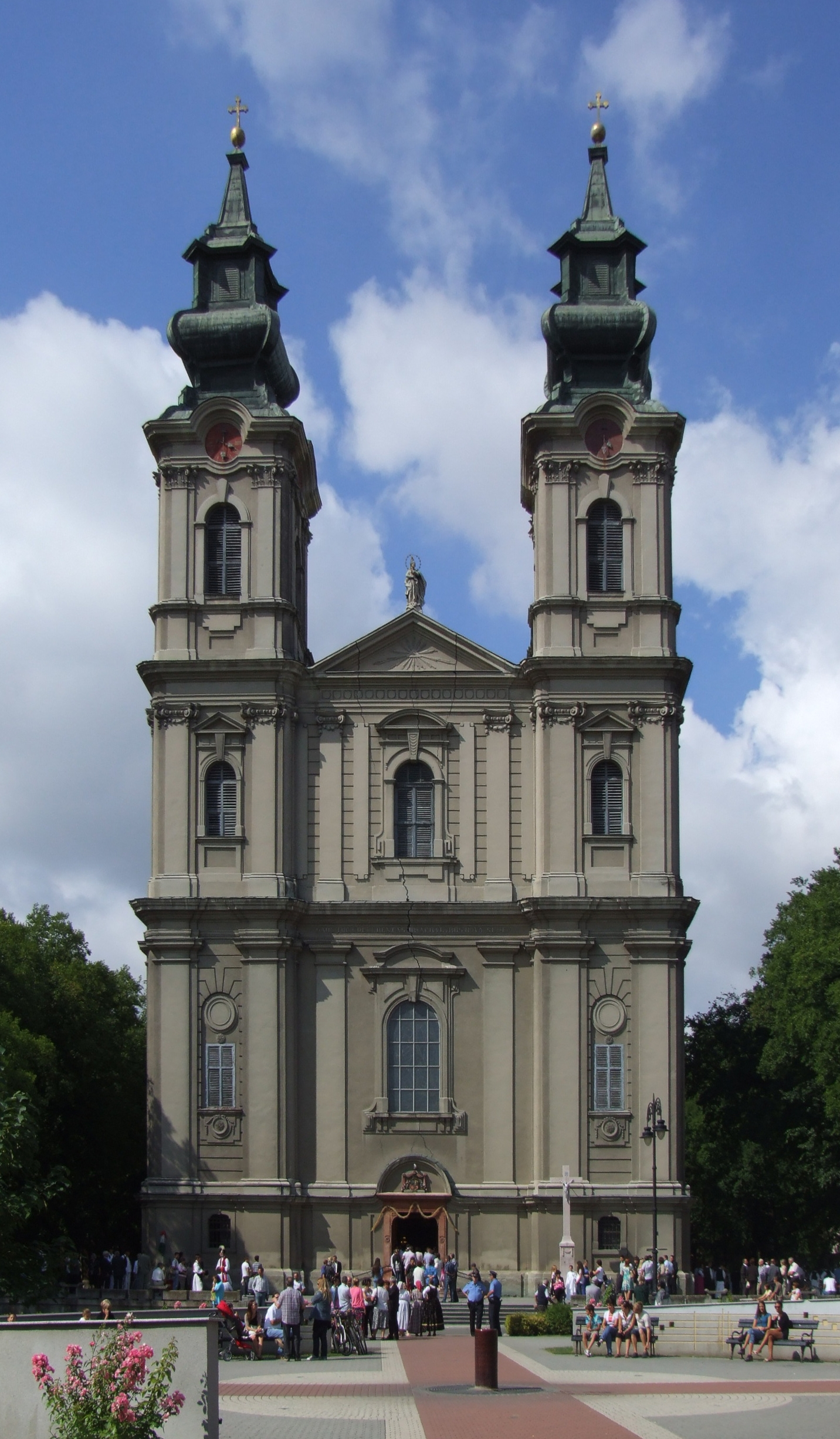
- Cathedral of St. Teresa of Avila in Subotica

Location
- Country: Serbia
- Ecclesiastical province: Belgrade
- Metropolitan: Archdiocese of Belgrade

Statistics
- Area: 8,042 km^{2} (3,105 sq mi)
- Population: Total; Catholics: (as of 2022); ▼915,885; ▼192,570 (▼21%)
- Parishes: 114

Information
- Denomination: Catholic
- Sui iuris church: Latin Church
- Rite: Roman Rite
- Established: 1923 (Apostolic Administration of Bačka); 1968 (Diocese of Subotica)
- Cathedral: Cathedral of St. Teresa of Avila, Subotica

Current leadership
- Pope: Leo XIV
- Bishop: Ferenc Fazekas
- Metropolitan Archbishop: Ladislav Nemet
- Bishops emeritus: János Pénzes

Map
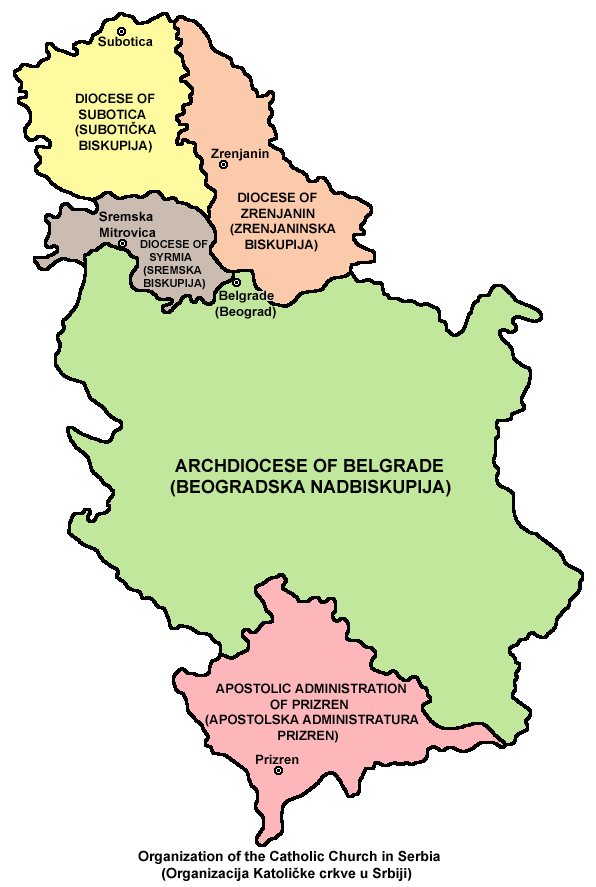

Website
- suboticka-biskupija.info

The Diocese of Subotica (Latin: Dioecesis Suboticanus; Hungarian: Szabadkai Egyházmegye; Croatian: Subotička biskupija; Serbian: Суботичка бискупија) is a Latin diocese of the Catholic Church in Serbia, covering Serbian part of the Bačka region. It is a suffragan diocese in the ecclesiastical province of the Archdiocese of Belgrade. The episcopal see is located at the Cathedral of St. Teresa of Avila in Subotica.

== History ==
Until the end of World War I, the territory of the present-day Diocese of Subotica belonged to the Diocese of Kalocsa. After the collapse of Austria-Hungary, most of the region of Bačka was incorporated into newly formed Kingdom of Serbs, Croats, and Slovenes (later known as Yugoslavia). In 1923, the Apostolic Administration of Yugoslav Bačka was created. Before the end of World War II, there was a sizable number of Catholic Germans in the region of Bačka. In 1968, apostolic administration was elevated into the rank of diocese as "Diocese of Subotica". In 1986, it was placed under metropolitan jurisdiction of the Archdiocese of Belgrade. From the middle 1980s, and especially during the 1990s, number of Catholics in the territory of this diocese decreased due to various reasons, including low birth rates among local Roman Catholics, economic emigration, and ethnic tensions due the Yugoslav Wars.

== Ordinaries ==
=== Apostolic Administrators ===
- Lajčo Budanović (1923–1958)
- Matija Zvekanović (1958–1968)

=== Bishops ===
- Matiša Zvekanović (1968–1989)
- János Pénzes (1989–2020)
- Slavko Večerin (2020–2022)
- Ferenc Fazekas (2023–present)

== Education ==
The diocese runs the only Catholic high school in the country, the Paulinum Gymnasium in Subotica.

== Media ==
Hitélet is the oldest Catholic monthly magazine of the diocese in Hungarian. Hírviviő is the weekly Catholic magazine in Hungarian. Zvonik is a Catholic magazine founded by Croat priests from Diocese of Subotica, published in Croatian.

== Gallery ==
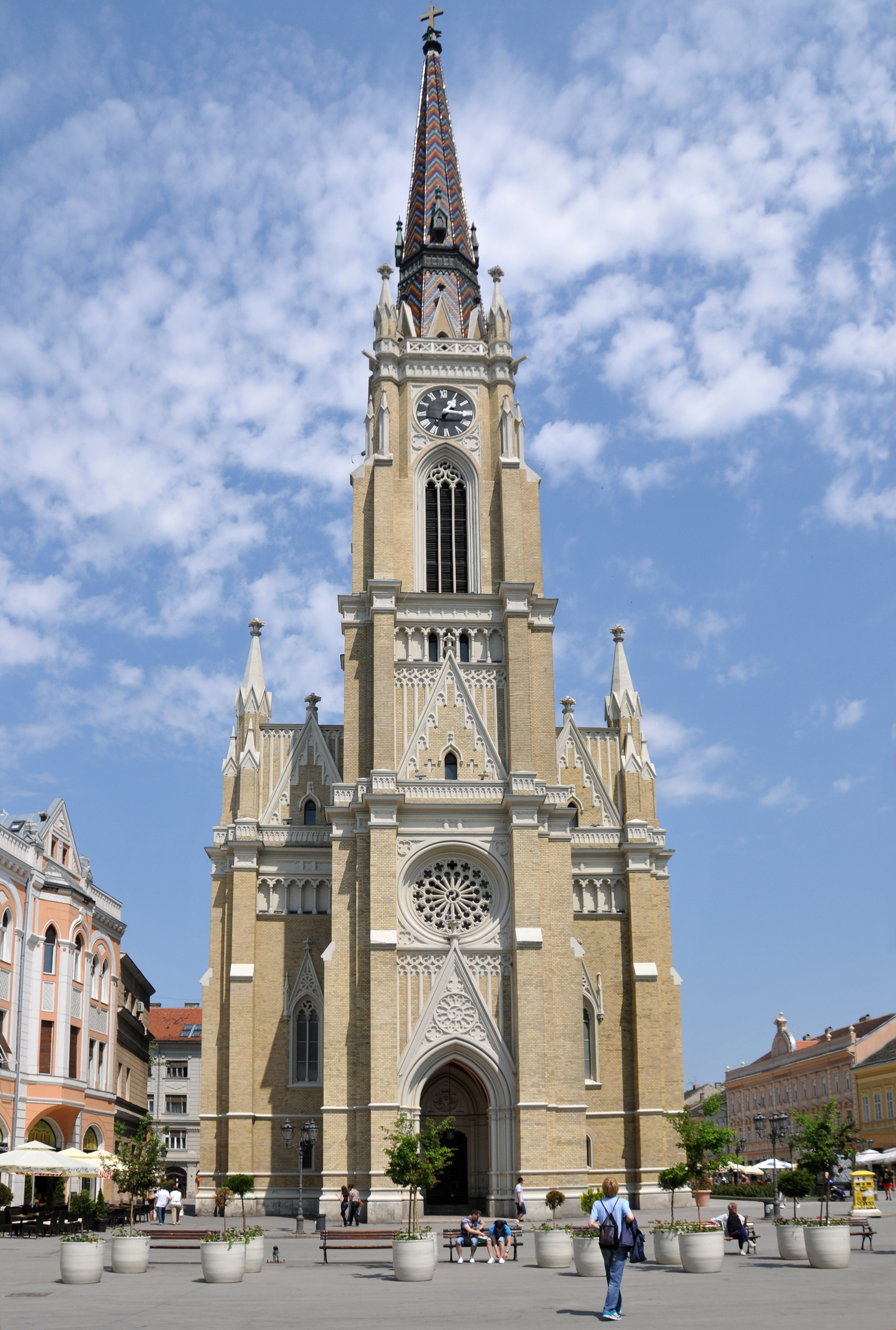
Name of Mary Church in Novi Sad

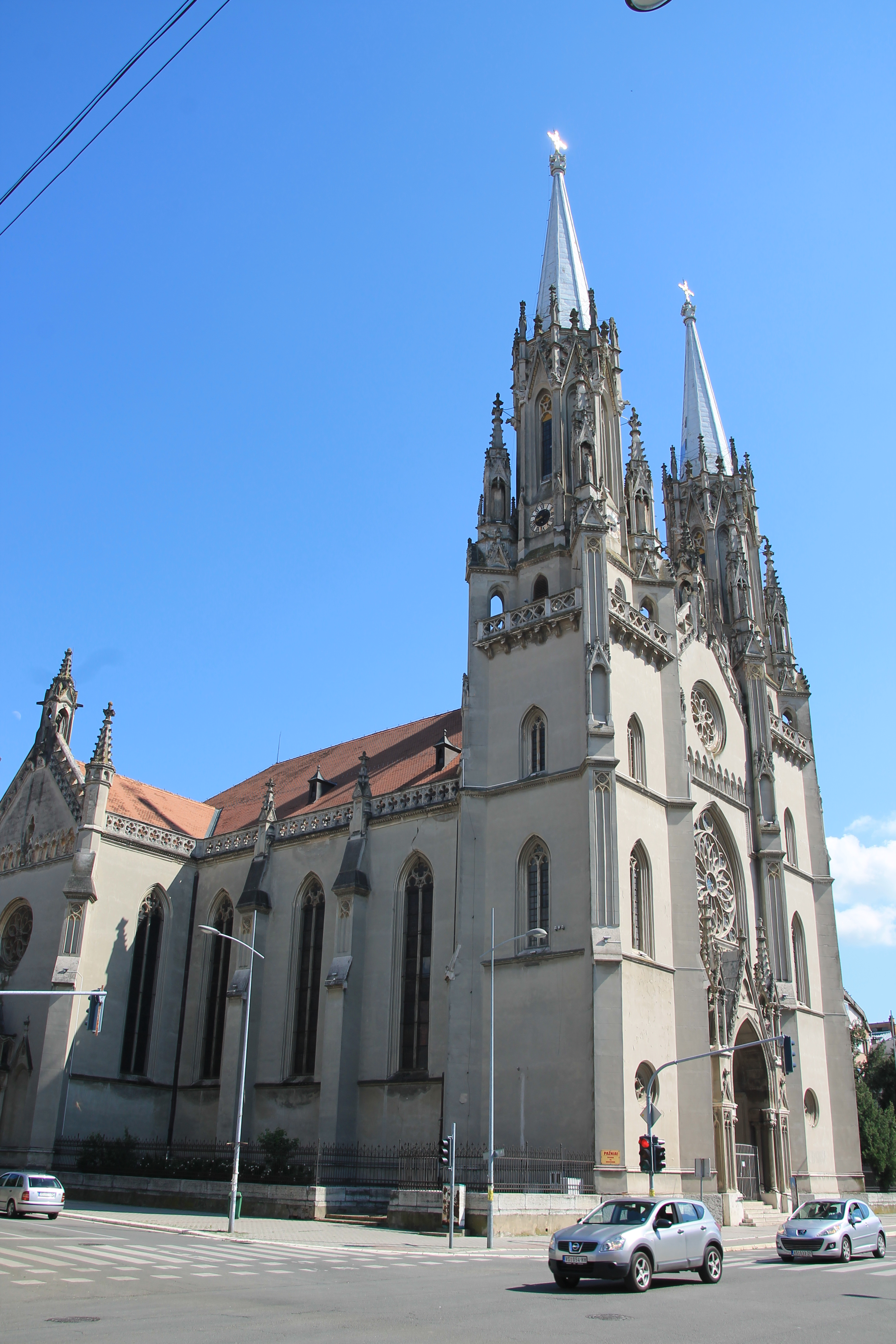
Church of Saint Gerhard de Sangredo in Vršac

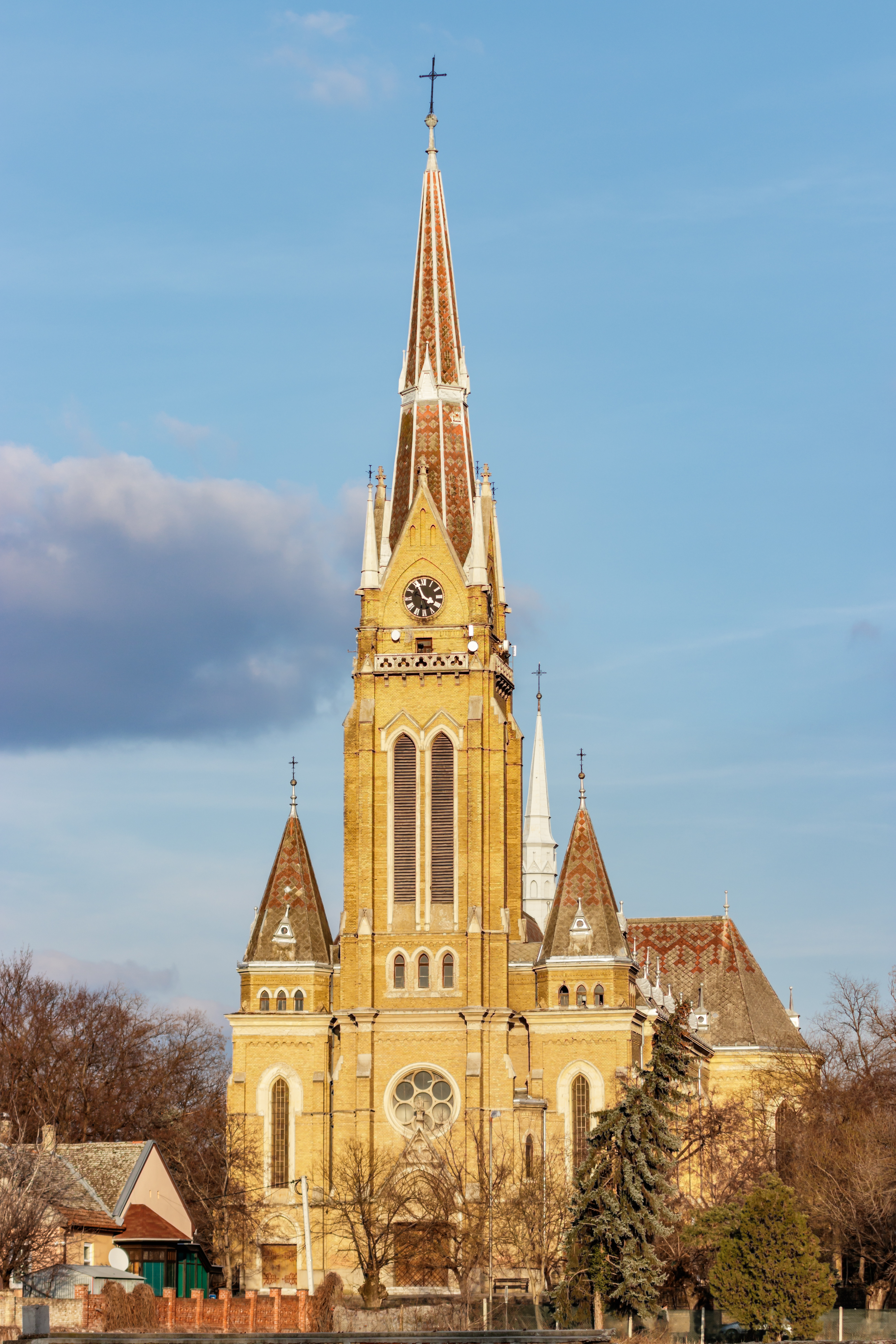
Church of the Visitation of the Blessed Virgin Mary in Bačka Topola

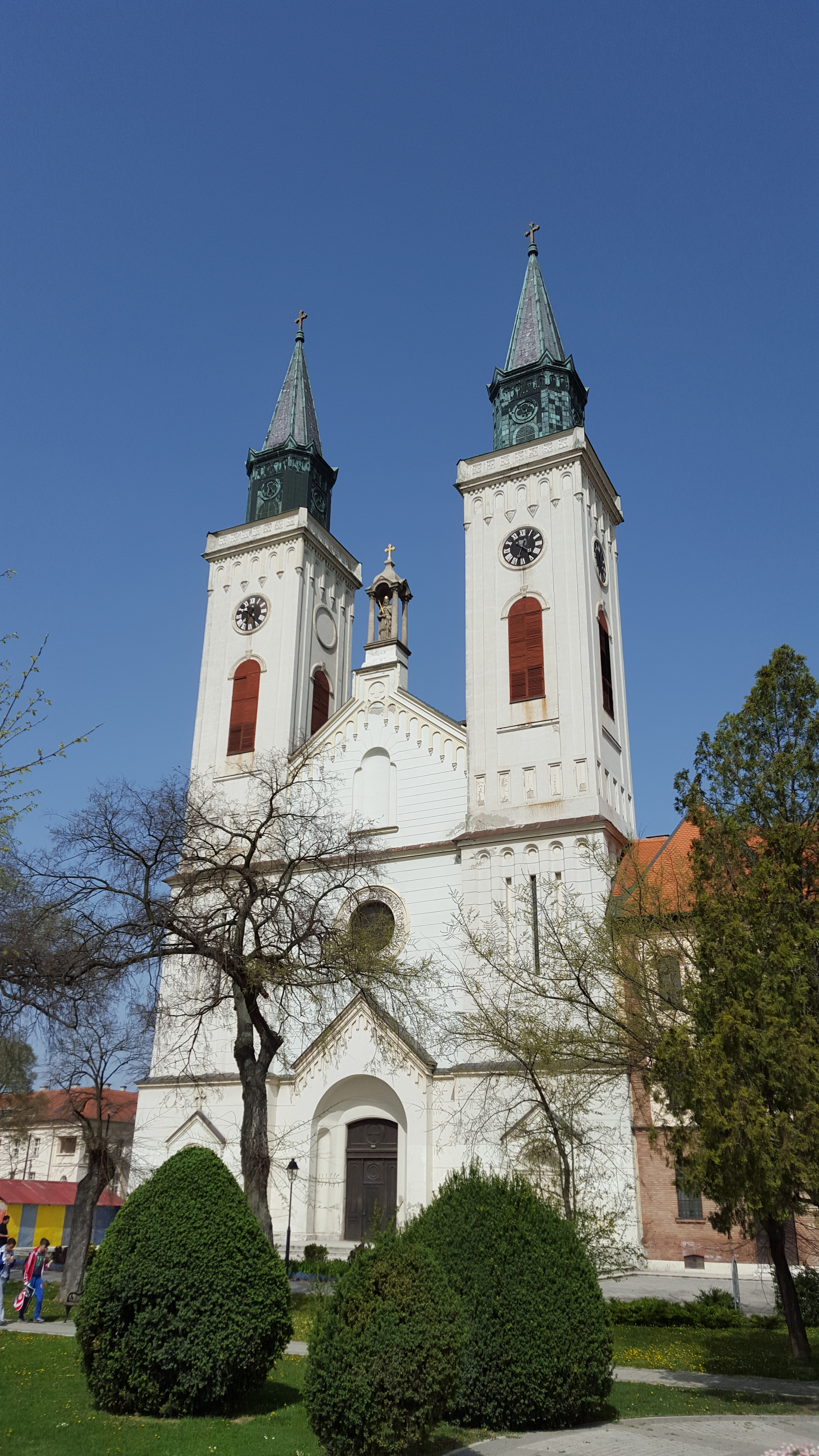
Church of Saint Stephen the King in Sombor

== See also ==
- Catholic Church in Serbia
- List of Catholic dioceses in Serbia
