= Archdiocese of Đakovo–Osijek =

Roman Catholic archdiocese in Croatia

Coordinates: 45.3100°N 18.4100°E

Archdiocese of Đakovo-Osijek Archidioecesis Diacovensis-Osijekensis Đakovačko-osječka nadbiskupija

Catholic
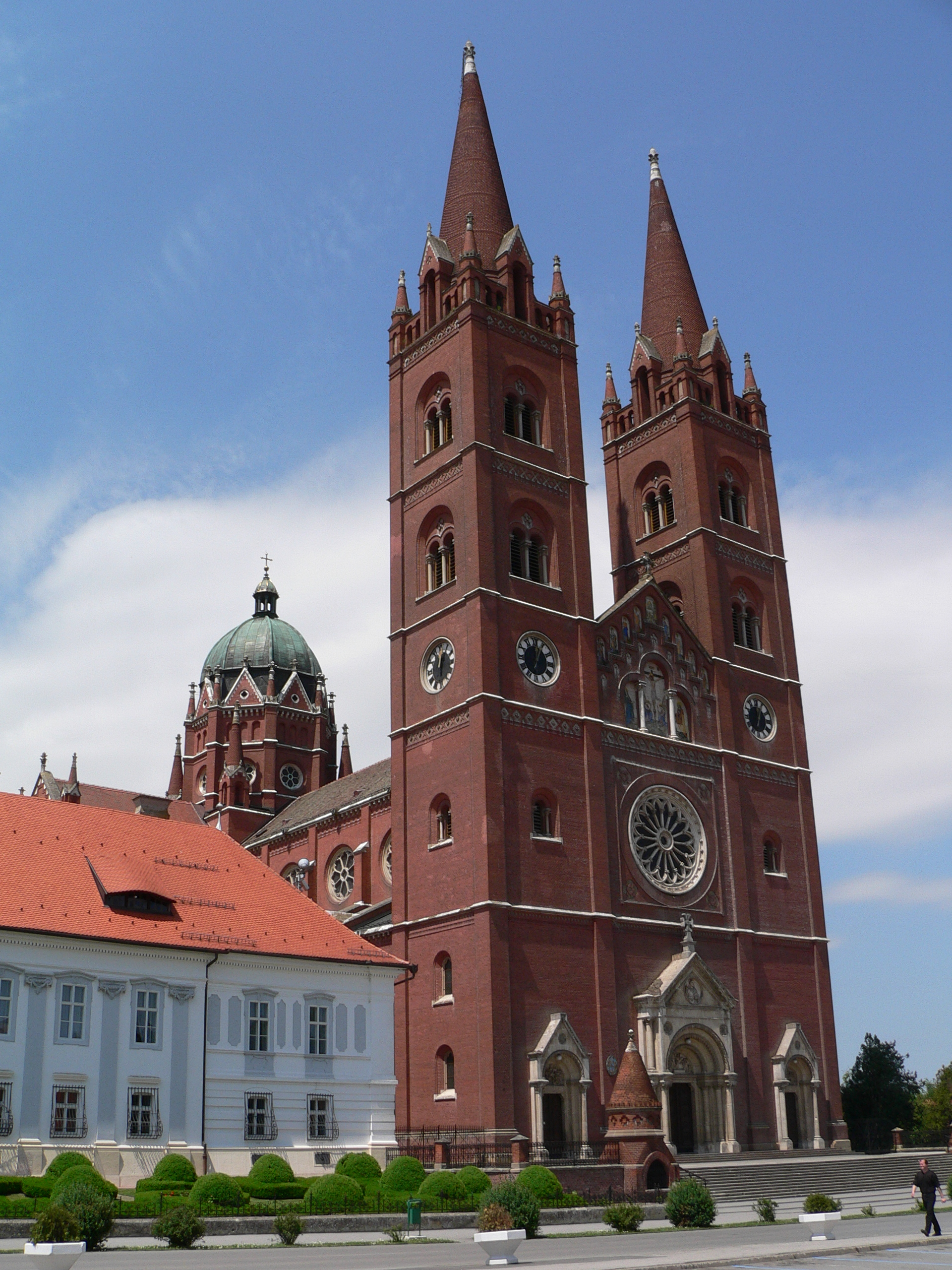
- Đakovo Cathedral

Location
- Country: Croatia; Bosnia and Herzegovina
- Metropolitan: Đakovo
- Archdeaconries: 6 (Katedralni, Baranjski, Osiječki, Brodski Bizovački i Srijemski)
- Deaneries: 16

Statistics
- Area: 7,752 km^{2} (2,993 sq mi)
- Population: Total; Catholics: (as of 2013); 641,000; 546,000 (85.2%)
- Parishes: 153

Information
- Denomination: Roman Catholic
- Rite: Roman Rite
- Established: 4th century
- Cathedral: Cathedral of St. Peter, Đakovo
- Co-cathedral: Co-cathedral of St. Peter and St. Paul, Osijek
- Patron saint: Saint Elijah
- Language: Croatian; Italian; Serbian; German

Current leadership
- Pope: Leo XIV
- Metropolitan Archbishop: Đuro Hranić
- Coadjutor: Ivan Ćurić
- Suffragans: Ivo Martinović, Fabijan Svalina
- Vicar General: Ivan Lenić
- Episcopal Vicars: Ivan M° Andrić

Map

Website
- djos.hr

The Archdiocese of Đakovo–Osijek (Croatian: Đakovačko-osječka nadbiskupija; Latin: Archidioecesis Diacovensis–Osijekensis) is a Latin archdiocese of the Catholic Church in Croatia, centred in the city of Đakovo. The Archdiocese has two suffragans: the Diocese of Požega, and the Diocese of Srijem.

Đuro Hranić was appointed Archbishop on 18 April 2013 by Pope Francis following the resignation of Marin Srakić.

== History ==
Originally erected in the 4th century as the diocese of Syrmia, the diocese was united with the Diocese of Bosnia in July 1773, when it was named the Diocese of Bosnia or Ðakovo and Srijem (Bosniensis seu Diacovensis et Sirmiensis). In 1963, the diocese was renamed to the diocese of Đakovo or Bosnia and Srijem (Diacovensis seu Bosnensis et Sirmiensis).

It was elevated to an Archdiocese on July 18, 2008 by Pope Benedict XVI, renamed to the Archdiocese of Đakovo-Osijek and the new Diocese of Srijem was split off, and made a suffragan. The new Archdiocese also received the Diocese of Požega, as its second suffragan.

Archdiocese hosted fifth National meeting of Croatian Catholic families on 19-20 September 2026 in Osijek and Aljmaš.

== Ordinaries ==
=== Diocese of Sirmio ===
Latin Name: Sirmiensis
Erected: 4th Century

- Petar (around 1374)

...

- Konrad Schnosputger, O.S.A. (26 Jul 1433 - 1436 Died)

...

- Giacomo Piceno, O.F.M. (1454 - 1459 Died)
- Orbán (22 Apr 1460 - 1465 Died)

...

- Miklós Báthori (8 Jan 1473 - 22 Apr 1474 Appointed, Bishop of Vác)
- Zsigmond Palóczy (5 Apr 1475 - 1479 Died)
- Boldizsár (25 Jun 1479 - 1481 Died)
- János Vitéz (31 Mar 1482 - 3 Jun 1489 Appointed, Bishop of Veszprém)
- Stjepan Crispo (26 Feb 1490 - )
- Mikuláš Csáky (de Bačka) (29 Apr 1499 - 5 Jun 1501 Appointed, Bishop of Nitra)
- Gabril Polgar (30 May 1502 - )
- István de Szatmar (2 Sep 1502 - 1505 Died)
- János Ország de Guth ( 1505 - 1520 Appointed, Bishop of Vác)
- László de Macedonia (Dec 1520 - 1526 Resigned)
- Stjepan Brodarić (11 Mar 1526 - 30 May 1539 Appointed, Bishop of Vác)
- Márton Pethe de Hetes (1582 - 26 Oct 1583 Appointed, Bishop of Vác)
- Štefan da Trnava, O.S.P.P.E. (20 Mar 1589 - 1592 Died)
- Miklós Zelniczey Naprady (1593 - 17 Jun 1596 Appointed, Bishop of Pécs)
- Šimun Bratulić, O.S.P.P.E. (15 Jan 1601 - 13 Sep 1604 Appointed, Bishop of Zagreb)
- László Majthényi (18 May 1616 - 1624 Died)
- Francesco Jany (1 Jul 1697 - Apr 1702 Died)
- Joseph Antoine Marie Favini, O.F.M. Conv. (14 May 1703 - 22 Nov 1717 Died)
- Franjo Vernić (22 Nov 1717 - 27 Jun 1729 Died)
- Gabriel Patačić (12 Feb 1731 - 28 Sep 1733 Appointed, Archbishop of Kalocsa)
- Ladislav Szörényi (15 Feb 1734 - 13 Nov 1752 Died)
- Nicolò Givovich (13 Nov 1752 - 16 May 1762 Died)
- Ivan Krstitelj Paxy (20 Dec 1762 - 10 Sep 1770 Confirmed, Bishop of Zagreb)

...

=== Diocese of Bosnia (Djakovo) and Syrmia ===
United: 9 July 1773 with the Diocese of Bosnia
Latin Name: Bosniensis seu Diacovensis et Sirmiensis
Metropolitan: Archdiocese of Zagreb

- Anton Mandić (26 Aug 1806 - 11 Jan 1815 Died)
- Emeric Karol Raffay (22 Jul 1816 - 10 Jan 1830 Died)
- Pál Mátyás Szutsits (28 Feb 1831 - 13 Apr 1834 Died)
- Josip Kuković (30 Sep 1834 - 2 Dec 1849 Resigned)
- Josip Juraj Strossmayer (20 May 1850 - 8 Apr 1905 Died)
- Ivan Baptista Krapàc (24 May 1910 - 15 Jul 1916 Died)
- Anton Akšamović (22 Apr 1920 - 28 Mar 1942 Resigned)
- Stjepan Bauerlein (12 Oct 1959 - 10. November 1980.Resigned due to reaching the canonical age )

=== Diocese of Djakovo o Bosnia and Syrmia ===
Name Changed: 18 November 1963
Latin Name: Diacovensis seu Bosnensis et Sirmiensis
Metropolitan: Archdiocese of Zagreb

- Ćiril Kos (6 Feb 1974 - 6 Feb 1997 Retired)
- Marin Srakić (6 Feb 1997 Succeeded - 18 Apr 2013 Retired)

=== Archdiocese of Ðakovo-Osijek ===
18 June 2008: Elevated and Separated into the Archdiocese of Ðakovo-Osijek and the Diocese of Syrmia
Latin Name: Diacovensis seu Bosnensis et Sirmiensis
Metropolitan: Archdiocese of Zagreb

- Đuro Hranić (18 Apr 2013 - )
