= Marin Srakić =

Croatian Roman Catholic prelate (1937–2026)

The Most Reverend Marin Srakić
- Archbishop of Đakovo-Osijek
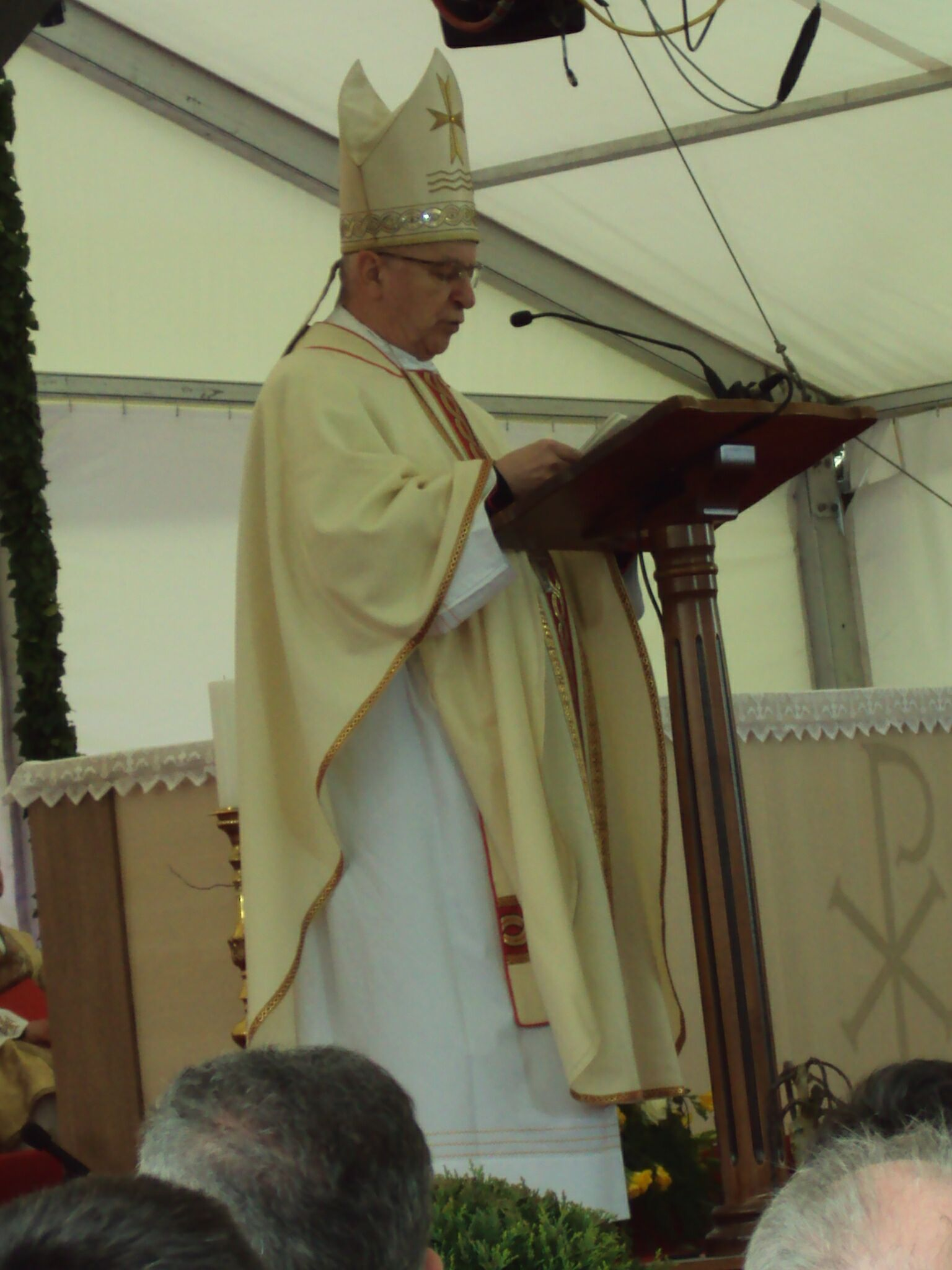
- Church: Roman Catholic Church
- Appointed: 6 February 1997 (as diocesan bishop); 18 June 2008 (as archdiocesan archbishop)
- Term ended: 18 April 2013
- Predecessor: Ćiril Kos
- Successor: Đuro Hranić
- Other posts: Titular Bishop of Cercina (1990–1996), Auxiliary Bishop (1990–1996) and Codjutor Bishop (1996–1997) of Djakovo or Bosna and Srijem

Orders
- Ordination: 6 March 1960 (Priest)
- Consecration: 24 March 1990 (Bishop) by Franjo Kuharić

Personal details
- Born: Marin Srakić; 6 July 1937 Ivanovci, Kingdom of Yugoslavia (present day Croatia)
- Died: 2 November 2026 (aged 89) Đakovo, Croatia
- Education: University of Zagreb, Pontifical Lateran University
- Motto: Spe et labore

Marin Srakić (6 July 1937 – 2 November 2026) was a Croatian Roman Catholic prelate who served as an auxiliary bishop of Đakovo or Bosna and Srijem and titular bishop of Cercina (1990–1996) and then as a coadjutor bishop (1996–1997), diocesan bishop (1997–2008) and the first Archbishop of Đakovo-Osijek from 2008 until his retirement in 2013.

== Early life and education ==
Srakić was born into the Croatian Roman Catholic family of Marko and Katja (née Orešković) in the present-day Osijek-Baranja County.

After graduation from the Archdiocesan Classical Gymnasium in Šalata in Zagreb, he made the maturity exam at the lyceum of the theological college in Đakovo and consequently joined the theological faculty at the University of Zagreb where he completed his studies with a licentiate theology degree, and was ordained as a priest on 6 March 1960 for his native Diocese of Đakovo or Bosna and Srijem. Srakić continued his studies at the Pontifical Lateran University in Rome, Italym with a Doctor of Theology degree in moral theology.

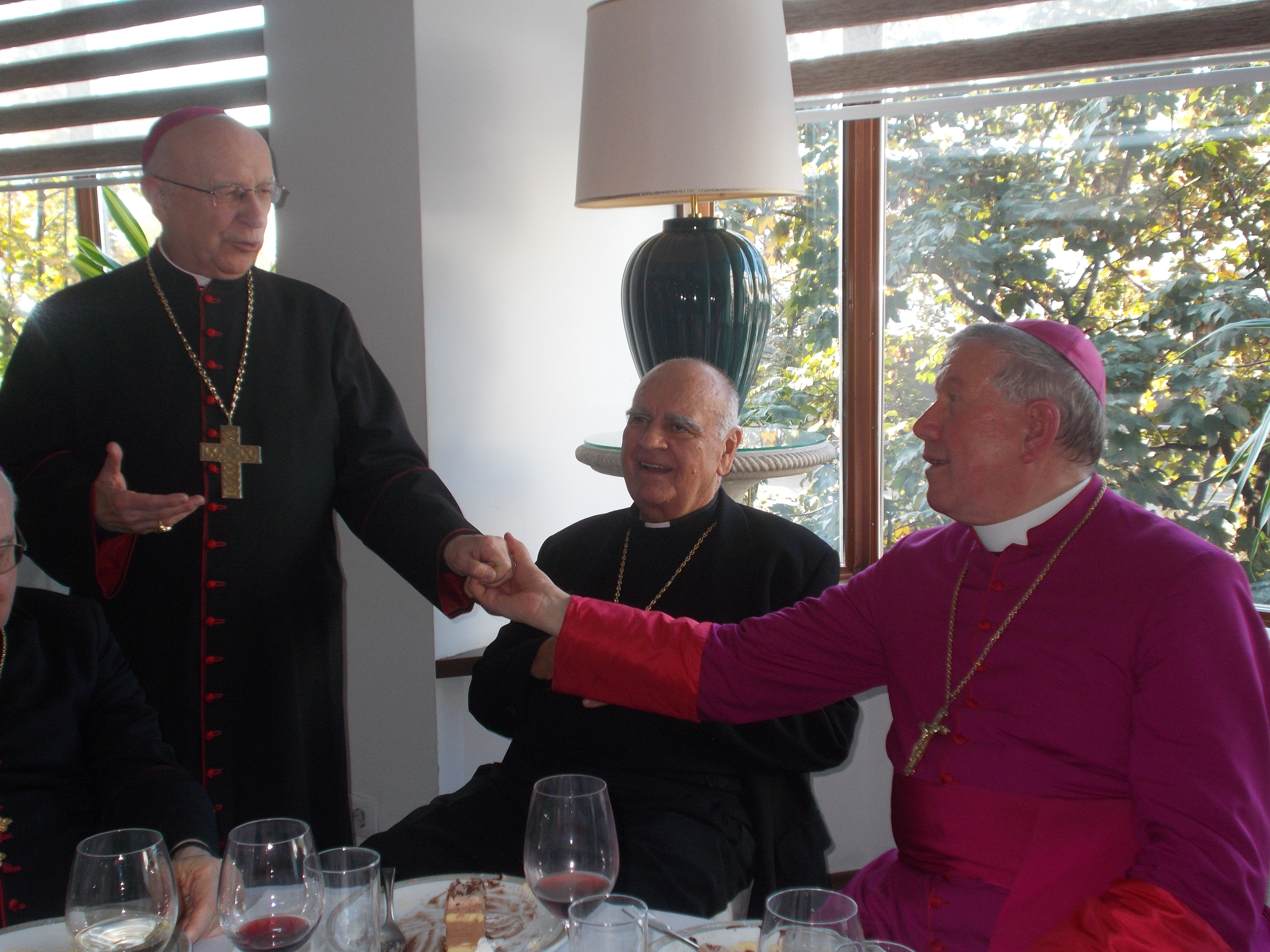
Srakić (from the left) greeting Archbishop Stanislav Hočevar

== Pastoral and educational life ==
After completed his education, Srakić had the following positions: from 1960 to 1961 he was a spiritual assistant in Slavonski Brod; from 1961 to 1965 was a parish administrator in Podgajci Podravski; from 1965 to 1967 and from 1970 to 1973 an educator at the theological seminary in Đakovo; from 1977 to 1989 rector of the major theological seminary in Đakovo; from 1966 to 1967 and from 1970 to 1999 he was Professor of Moral Theology at the theological college in Đakovo, later Theology in Đakovo, a field study of the Catholic Theological Faculty of the University of Zagreb.

== Prelate ==
On 2 February 1990, he was appointed by Pope John Paul II as an auxiliary bishop of the Archdiocese of Đakovo or Bosna and Srijem and titular Bishop of Cercina. On 24 March 1990, he was consecrated as a bishop by Cardinal Franjo Kuharić and other prelates of the Roman Catholic Church at the Cathedral of St. Peter and St. Paul in Đakovo. He was appointed as a Vicar General of this Diocese (1990–1997) and consequently was appointed as a Coadjutor Bishop of this Diocese on 10 February 1996, and succeeded as the Diocesan Bishop on 6 February 1997. At the session of the Episcopal Conference of Croatia in Gospić on 18 October 2007, he was elected president of the conference and held that position for a quinquennium until November 2012.

Srakić retired on 18 April 2013 after reaching the age limit of 75 years.

Srakić died, aged 89, on 2 November 2026.

Catholic Church titles
Preceded by Fernando Charrier	Titular Bishop of Cercina; 1990–1996	Succeeded by Silvano Maria Tomasi
Preceded by Nicolò Givovich	Codjutor Bishop of Djakovo or Bosna and Srijem; 1996–1997	Succeeded by none
Preceded by Ćiril Kos	Bishop of Djakovo or Bosna and Srijem; 1997–2008	Succeeded by himself as Archdiocesan Archbishop
Preceded by himself as Diocesan Bishop	Archbishop of Đakovo-Osijek; 2008–2013	Succeeded by Đuro Hranić
Preceded by Josip Bozanić	President of the Episcopal Conference of Croatia; 2007–2012	Succeeded by Želimir Puljić
