= Ferenc Fazekas =

Serbian Roman Catholic prelate (born 1958)

- Diocesan Bishop of Roman Catholic Diocese of Subotica
- Church: Roman Catholic Church
- Appointed: 7 October 2023
- Predecessor: Slavko Večerin
- Successor: Incumbent
- Previous posts: Vicar General of Diocese of Subotica (2020–2022), Administrator of Diocese of Subotica (2022–2023)

Orders
- Ordination: 29 June 1984 (Priest)
- Consecration: 11 November 2023 (Bishop) by Đuro Hranić

Personal details
- Born: Ferenc Fazekas; 29 September 1958 (age 68) Bečej, SR Serbia, FPR Yugoslavia
- Education: University of Zagreb
- Coat of arms

Bishop Ferenc Fazekas (Serbian Cyrillic: Ференц Фазекаш; born 29 September 1958) is a Serbian Roman Catholic prelate who is serving as the diocesan bishop of the Diocese of Subotica in Serbia since 7 October 2023. He is a member of the International Bishops' Conference of Saints Cyril and Methodius.

== Education ==
Bishop Fazekas was born into a Vojvodina Hungarians Roman Catholic family in Bečej (town located in the South Bačka District).

After graduation from the classical gymnasium Paulinum in Subotica in 1977, he consequently joined the Archdiocesan Theological Seminary in Zagreb and the Theological Faculty at the University of Zagreb, where he studied from 1977 until 1984, and was ordained as priest on 29 June 1984 in the Cathedral of St. Theresa of Avila for his native Diocese of Subotica, after completed his philosophical and theological studies.

== Later career ==
After his ordination Fr. Fazekas two years served as an assistant priest in the parish of the Holy Trinity in Sombor (1984–1986) and in Bačka Topola, until in 1986 he was appointed administrator of the parish in Bajša. Then, in 1988, he was transferred to Bogojevo, where he served until 1993. He served as a parish priest again from 1993 in Bajša, then from 1994 in the parish of St. Francis in Senta, then from 1998 in Bačka Topola, and in 2021 he was appointed parish priest of the parish of St. Jurja in Subotica. And at the same time, between 2005 and 2012 he served as the dean of the Bačka Topola deanery, and from 2012 to 2020 he was the archpresbyter of the Potis archpresbyterate.

He was the Vicar General of the Diocese of Subotica since 2020 until 2022 and was an Administrator of the same Diocese from 2022 to 2023, after an unexpected death of his predecessor.

== Prelate ==
On 7 October 2023, he was appointed by Pope Francis as the forth diocesan bishop of Subotica. On 11 November 2023, he was consecrated as bishop by Archbishop Dražen Kutleša and other prelates of the Roman Catholic Church in the Cathedral of St. Theresa of Avila in Subotica.

Catholic Church titles
Preceded by Slavko Večerin	Diocesan Bishop of Subotica; 2023–	Succeeded by Incumbent
