= Ivan Ćurić (bishop) =

Croatian Roman Catholic bishop

- Titular archbishop of Tela, Auxiliary Bishop of Đakovo-Osijek
- Church: Roman Catholic Church
- Appointed: 11 March 2019
- Other post: Župnik u Zenici

Orders
- Ordination: 29 June 1990 (Priest) by Bishop Ćiril Kos
- Consecration: 22 April 2019 (Bishop) by Archbishop Đuro Hranić

Personal details
- Born: Ivan Ćurić; 1 February 1964 (age 62) Prisoje, SFR Yugoslavia (present day in Bosnia and Herzegovina )
- Education: Pontifical Gregorian University

Bishop Ivan Ćurić (born 1 December 1964) is a Croatian Roman Catholic prelate who is currently serving as Auxiliary Bishop of the Đakovo-Osijek since 11 March 2019.

Coat of arms of Bishop Ivan Ćurić

== Life ==
Bishop Ćurić was born into a Croatian Roman Catholic family of Ante and + Pavka (née Kolak) in the Eastern Croatia. After graduated a primary school in 1979, he began his priestly formation, first at the Interdiocesan Minor Seminary in Zagreb, and later in Đakovo. After his compulsory military service in Banja Luka, he entered the Major Theological Seminary in Đakovo in 1984 and began his philosophical and theological studies, which he continued at the Pontifical Gregorian University in Rome, Italy in 1987, as a student at the Pontifical Collegium Germanicum et Hungaricum, and was ordained as deacon on 11 March 1989 and priest on 29 June 1990 for the Diocese of Djakovo o Bosna i Srijem, while completing his master's degree in philosophy.

After his return from Italy, Fr. Ćurić a short time served as an assistant priest in Osijek and a prefect in the Major Theological Seminary in Đakovo (1991–1992) and continued his studies at the Pontifical Croatian College of St. Jerome in Rome (1993–1996). After returning from studies the second time, he performed the following services: vice-rector of the Major Theological Seminary (1996–2007) in Đakovo, parish priest in Brodski Varoš (2007–2011), Dean of the Slavonski Brod Deanery (2010–2011), Rector of the Major Theological Seminary (2011–2013). Meanwhile, he had other assignments: head of the Diocesan Press Office (2002–2007) and a member of the presbyteral council (2011-2019). In 2013 he was appointed as a Vicar General of Archdiocese of Đakovo-Osijek.

On 11 March 2019 he was appointed by Pope Francis as an Auxiliary Bishop of Roman Catholic Archdiocese of Đakovo-Osijek and Titular Bishop of Tela. On 22 April 2019 he was consecrated as bishop by Archbishop Đuro Hranić and other prelates of the Roman Catholic Church in the Cathedral of St. Peter and St. Paul in Đakovo.

Catholic Church titles
Preceded by Engelbert Siebler	Titular Archbishop of Tela; 2019–current	Succeeded by Incumbent
