= Ćiril Kos =

Croatian Roman Catholic prelate

- Diocesan Bishop of Diocese of Đakovo or Bosna and Srijem
- Church: Roman Catholic Church
- Appointed: 6 February 1974
- Term ended: 6 February 1997
- Predecessor: Stjepan Bauerlein
- Successor: Marin Srakić

Orders
- Ordination: 9 July 1944 (Priest) by Anton Akšamović
- Consecration: 17 March 1974 (Bishop) by Mario Cagna

Personal details
- Born: Ćiril Kos; 19 November 1919 Ribić Breg, Kingdom of Serbs, Croats and Slovenes (present day Croatia)
- Died: 6 July 2003 (aged 83) Osijek, Croatia
- Motto: In Caritate - Humilitate et Vitae Simplicitate

Bishop Ćiril Kos (19 November 1919 – 6 July 2003) was a Croatian Roman Catholic prelate who served as the Diocesan Bishop of Đakovo or Bosna and Srijem since 6 February 1974 until his retirement on 6 February 1997. He also was a political prisoner in the former communist Yugoslavia during 1959–1962.

== Life ==
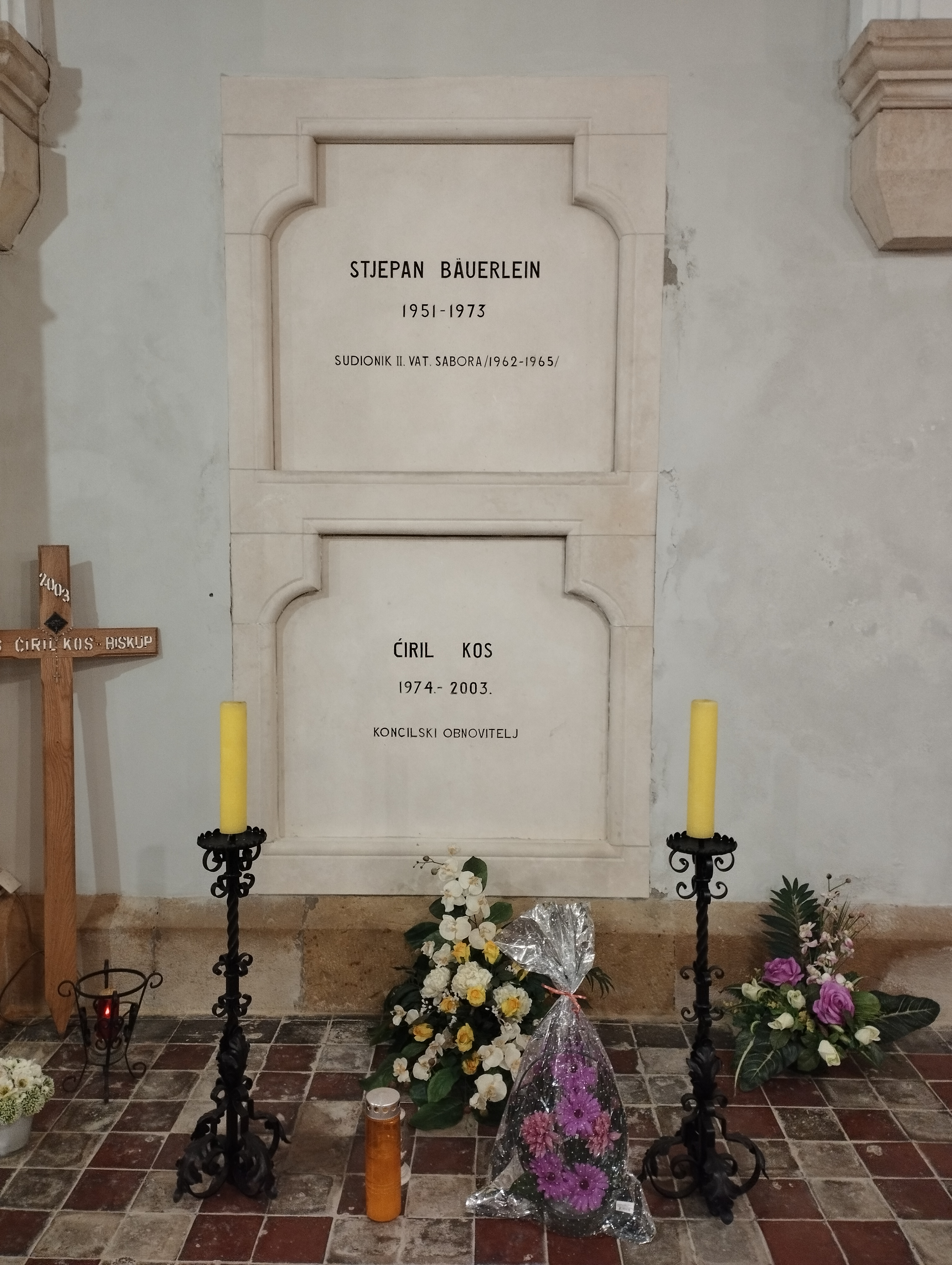
Kos' burial site in the krypt of the Đakovo Cathedral.

Bishop Kos was born into a Croatian Roman Catholic family of Josip and Marija (née Fadiga) in the present-day Varaždin County, but in childhood transferred with own parents and grew-up in Harkanovci.

After graduation of the school education in Široki Brijeg, Bosnia and Herzegovina, he consequently joined the Major Theological Seminary in Đakovo, and was ordained a priest on July 9, 1944 for the Diocese of Bosna, Đakovo and Srijem, after completing his philosophical and theological studies.

From August 1944 until the end of October of the same year, he served as chaplain in Srijemska Mitrovica. In short, due to the circumstances of the war, he also served as the administrator of the same parish. From 1946 to 1951 he was the parish priest in Trnjani near Garčin. From 1951 to 1959 he was a spiritual director at his alma mater – Theological Seminary in Đakovo. Here Fr. Kos was arrested and sentenced by the communist authorities to 7 years in prison. He served his sentence in Osijek and Stara Gradiška from October 5, 1959 to April 5, 1962. From 1962 to 1973 he served as secretary of the Episcopal Ordinariate in Đakovo. From 1973 to 1974, he was a capitular vicar.

On February 6, 1974, he was appointed by Pope Paul VI as the Diocesan Bishop of the Diocese of Đakovo or Bosna and Srijem. On March 17, 1974, he was consecrated as bishop by Archbishop Mario Cagna and other prelates of the Roman Catholic Church in the Cathedral of St. Peter and St. Paul in Đakovo.

He retired on February 6, 1997, after reaching age limit of 75 years old, and was succeeded by his Coadjutor Bishop. He died at the clinical hospital in Osijek on July 6, 2003, and was buried in the tomb of the Bishops of Đakovo and Srijem in the crypt of the cathedral-basilica in Đakovo two days later.

== Acknowledgements ==
In 1996 Kos was decorated with Order of Duke Trpimir by president of Croatia Franjo Tuđman.

Catholic Church titles
| Preceded by Stjepan Bauerlein | Diocesan Bishop of Djakovo or Bosna and Srijem; 1974–1997 | Succeeded by Marin Srakić |
