= Aleksandar Lifka =

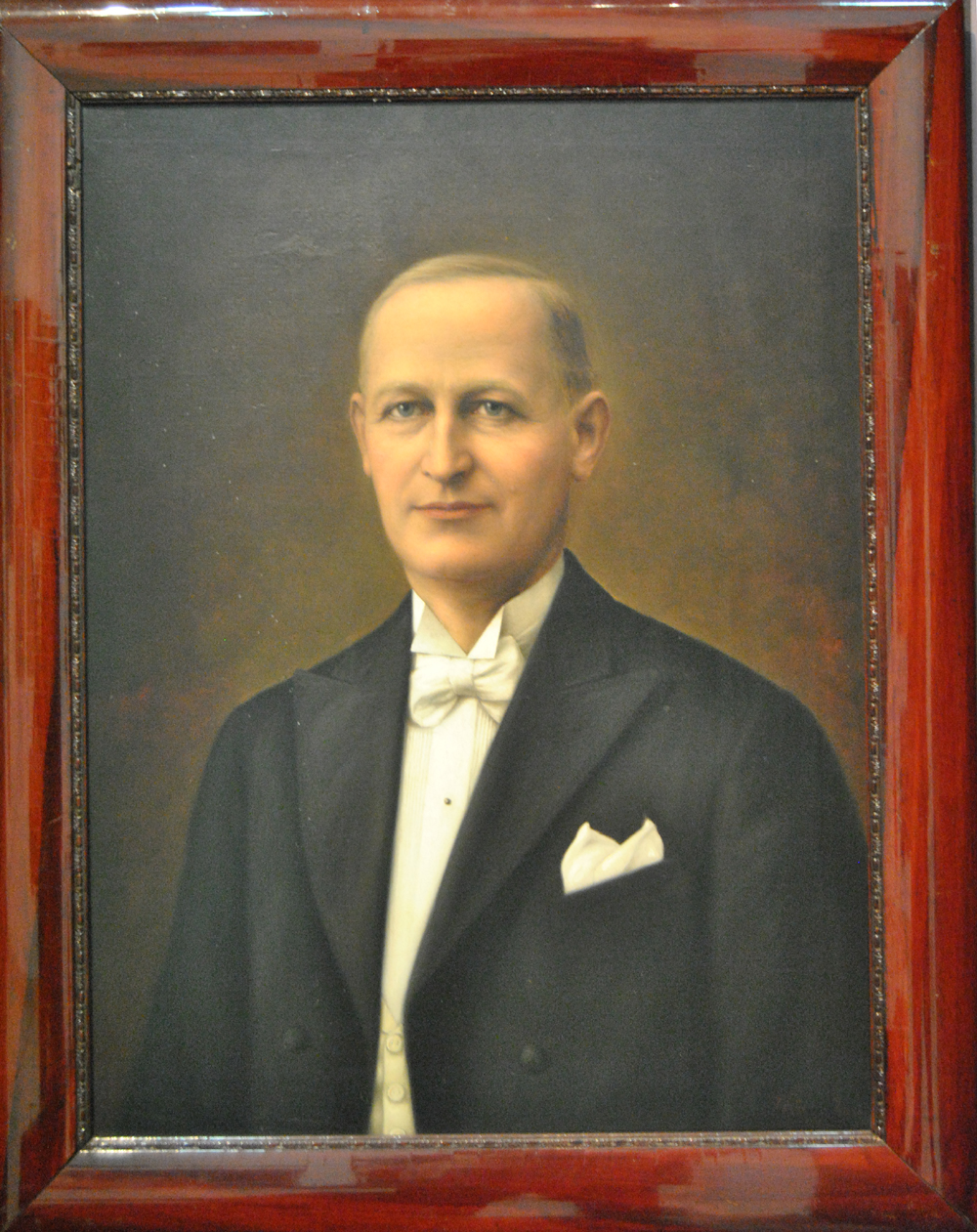
- Born: 20 May 1880; Brassó, Austria-Hungary
- Died: 12 November 1952 (aged 72); Subotica, Yugoslavia
- Occupation: Cinematographer
- Years active: 1929–1969

Aleksandar Lifka (20 May 1880 – 12 November 1952) was a Yugoslav cinematographer.

== Life ==
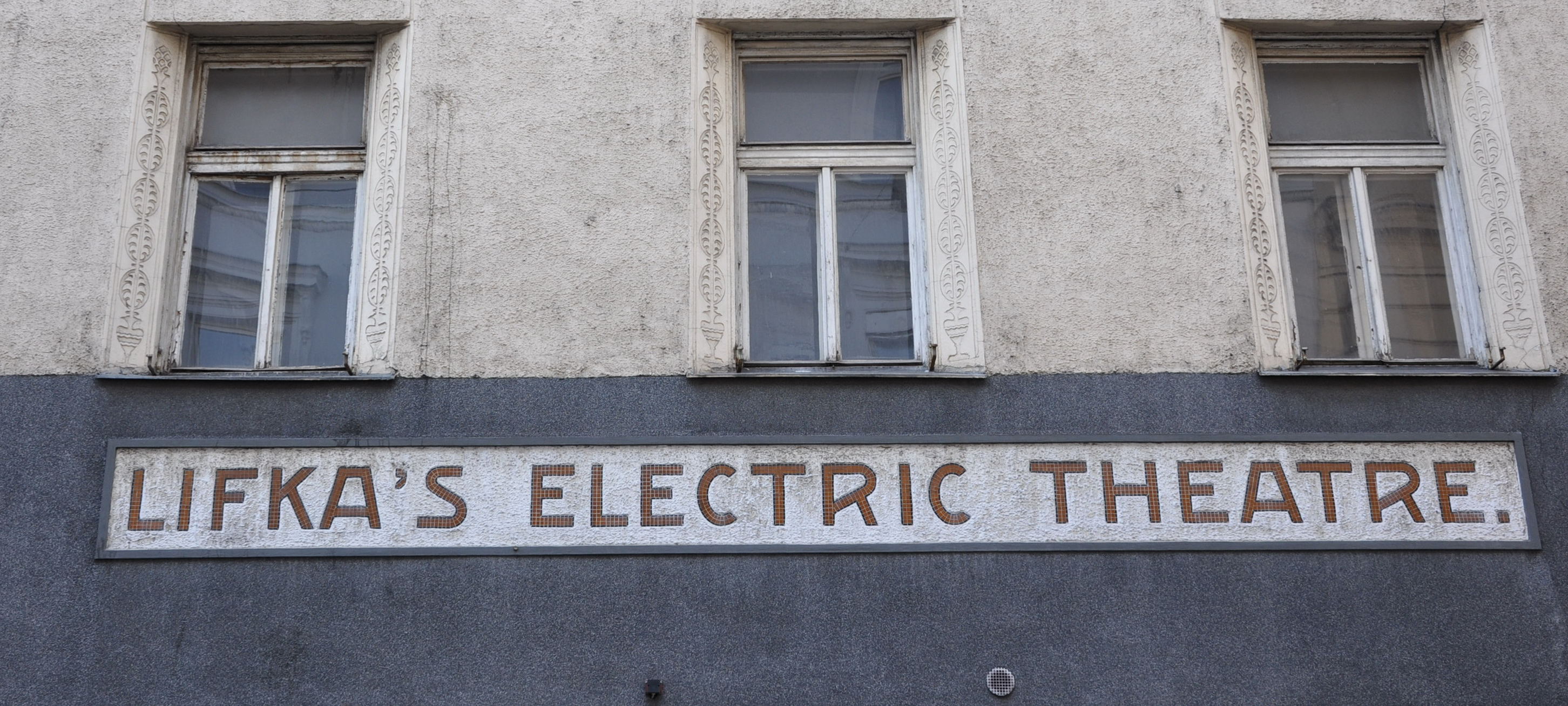
Former Lifka cinema in Linz

Lifka was born in Brassó in the Austro-Hungarian Empire, in what is now Romania to a Czech family. After spending his childhood with his parents in Žatec near Prague, he moved to Vienna to study at technical high school. During that time, he experimented with magic lantern moving pictures, but without success. After completing his education, Lifka traveled to Paris, where he bought a Pathé camera. In 1900, he shot the visit of the emperor Franz Joseph and Queen Elisabeth to the town of Gödöllő, in Hungary.

After his father's death, Lifka and his older brother Karl started a traveling movie theater. It had professional equipment (Gaumont, AEG, Körting) and had a luxurious interior. The first city in which they showed their films was Trieste, Italy. The tour continued in 1901 to Rijeka, Bjelovar, Osijek (Croatia), and Ljubljana (Slovenia), and in 1902 to Belgrade, Zemun, Újvidék (now Novi Sad, Serbia), and Szabadka (now Subotica, Serbia).

In 1903, the Lifka brothers bought another tent, and Karl separated and settled in Linz and Salzburg. Aleksandar Lifka shot documentary film of some political events, and of common people in the towns he visited.

Lifka visited Szabadka again in 1905, and in 1910, he renovated the grand hall of Hungaria Hotel into a permanent movie theater. His wife, Beck Erzsébet, helped him to run the cinema. During World War I, he was hired by Filmkriegspresse to create films about battles in Galizia, where he was wounded. After the end of war, he returned to Subotica, which then belonged to the Kingdom of Yugoslavia, and stopped making films. Only twenty of his original films survived. After World War II, he accepted Yugoslav citizenship.

He died on 12 November 1952 at his vineyard. He is buried in Subotica.
