= Cathedral of St. Theresa of Avila, Subotica =

Cathedral of St. Theresa of Avila
- Avilai Szent Teréz székesegyház Katedrala Svete Terezije Avilske; Катедрала Свете Терезе Авилске
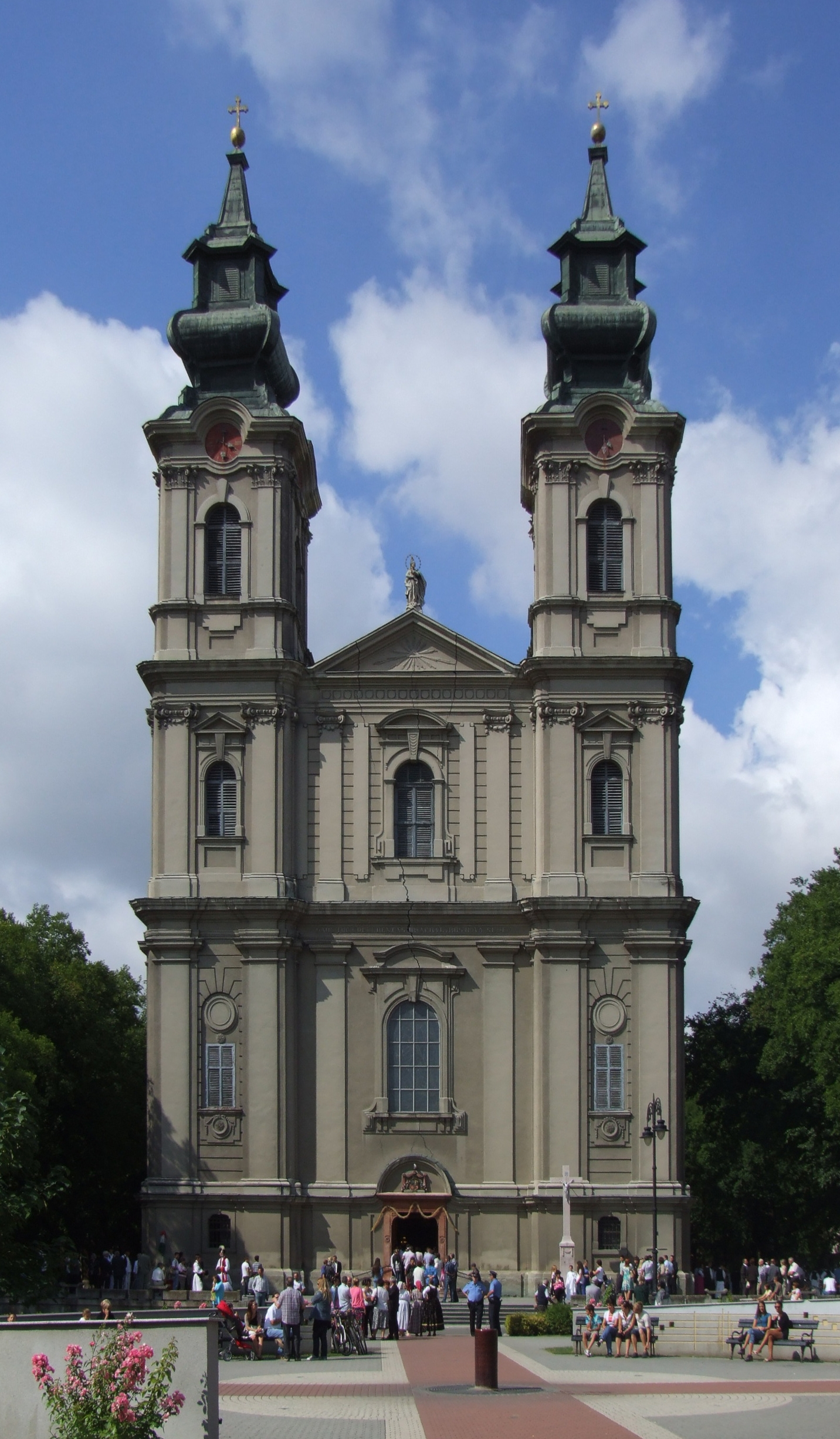
- Cathedral of St. Theresa of Avila, pictured in 2012
- Cathedral of St. Theresa of Avila
- 46.098575°N 19.658989°E
- Location: Subotica
- Country: Serbia
- Denomination: Roman Catholic Church
- Website: suboticka-katedrala.info

History
- Status: Cathedral and minor basilica
- Dedication: Theresa of Avila

Architecture
- Functional status: Active
- Heritage designation: Monument of Culture of Great Importance
- Architect: Franz Kaufmann
- Style: Baroque

Specifications
- Length: 61 metres (200 ft)
- Width: 26 metres (85 ft)
- Height: 64 metres (210 ft)

Administration
- Diocese: Diocese of Subotica

Clergy
- Bishop: Ferenc Fazekas
- Vicar: Stjepan Beretić

The Cathedral of St. Theresa of Avila (Hungarian: Avilai Szent Teréz székesegyház; Croatian: Katedrala Svete Terezije Avilske; Serbian: Катедрала Свете Терезе Авилске) is a Roman Catholic church and minor basilica located in Subotica, Serbia.' It is under jurisdiction of the Diocese of Subotica and serves as its cathedral church.

== History ==
The cathedral was built between 1773 and 1779 in the baroque style. At the time, Subotica was part of the Habsburg monarchy. The building was designed by architect Franz Kaufmann from Pest. The altar is decorated with several paintings by Josef Schoefft, one painting of the Holy Family by Kasper Schleibne, and one painting of the True Cross by Emmanuel Walch.

The building is 61 metres (200 ft) long and 26 metres (85 ft) wide. The nave is 18 metres (59 ft) tall, while the bell towers are 64 metres (210 ft) tall. On the roof of the building, between the two bell towers, is a statue of Virgin Mary. The pulpit was built in 1808. The pipe organ was installed in 1897 and renovated in 1997.

The whole interior of the church was renovated in 1972-73 for the bicentennial of the building. The building was declared the Monument of Culture of Great Importance in 1973. Pope Paul VI granted the title of minor basilica to the cathedral on 29 April 1974.

There is a bust of Aleksandar Lifka in front of the church.

== See also ==
- Catholic Church in Serbia
- List of cathedrals in Serbia
