= Ivan Ćurić (footballer) =

Croatian footballer

Personal information
- Date of birth: 18 May 1987 (age 39)
- Place of birth: Split, SFR Yugoslavia
- Height: 1.87 m (6 ft 2 in)
- Position: Forward

Youth career
- –2005: Hajduk Split
- 2005: Mosor
- 2006: Lokomotiva Zagreb

Senior career*
Years	Team	Apps	(Gls)
2006–2007	Konavljanin		
2007	Omiš		
2008	Uskok		
2008	Zmaj Makarska		
2009–2010	Primorac	50	(28)
2011–2012	Mosor	25	(15)
2012	Podbeskidzie	6	(0)
2012–2013	Imotski	12	(1)
2013	Mosor	12	(6)
2013–2014	Val	22	(13)
2014–2015	Solin	4	(0)
2015–2016	Mravince		

International career
2002–2003	Croatia U16	5	(1)
- * Club domestic league appearances and goals

Ivan Ćurić (born 18 May 1987) is a Croatian former professional footballer who played as a forward.

== Club career ==
A product of Hajduk Split academy, Ćurić started his senior career with several third level clubs, before his scoring form with Primorac 1929 netted him a transfer to the Druga HNL side Mosor. He excelled there in the first part of the 2011–12 season, scoring 12 goals in 12 matches, which made him the top scorer of the league at the winter break, along with Alen Guć and Martin Šaban. His form drew foreign attention and he moved to the Ekstraklasa side Podbeskidzie Bielsko-Biała in January 2012, on a one-and-a-half-year deal. He made his league debut in a 0–1 away win over Widzew Łódź on 18 February 2012.
