= Ivo Martinović =

Croatian bishop (born 1965)

Msgr. Ivo Martinović
- Diocese of Požega
- Archdiocese: Roman Catholic Diocese of Požega
- Province: Požega
- See: Požega
- Appointed: 11 March 2024
- Predecessor: Antun Škvorčević

Orders
- Ordination: 28 June 1992 by Srećko Badurina
- Consecration: 8 June 2024 by Dražen Kutleša

Personal details
- Born: Ivo Martinović; 28 June 1965 (age 61) Županja, SR Croatia, SFR Yugoslavia (modern Croatia)
- Denomination: Roman Catholic
- Parents: Martin Martinović and Marija (née Petrović)
- Education: University of Zagreb, Pontifical Lateran University
- Motto: Gaudium et pax Radost i mir Joy and peace
- Coat of arms

Ivo Martinović (born June 28, 1965 in Županja) is a prelate of the Catholic Church and the second bishop of the Roman Catholic Diocese of Požega.

== Biography ==
Msgr. Ivo Martinović was born on June 28, 1965, in Županja, Croatia, to Martin Martinović and Marija (née Petrović) as the fifth child in the family.

He was baptized in the Parish of the Martyrdom of St. John the Baptist in Županja on July 4, 1965. He received his First Communion and Confirmation at the Parish of the Assumption of the Blessed Virgin Mary in Tolisa, Bosnia and Herzegovina, where he grew up. He attended the lower grades of elementary school in Matići and the upper grades in Oštra Luka.

In the summer of 1980, after completing elementary school, he entered the seminary of the Third Order Regular of St. Francis and continued his classical high school education at the then Interdiocesan Seminary School for Priestly Formation in Zagreb. He served his mandatory military service in Belgrade (Serbia) from August 3, 1984, to August 16, 1985. That same year, he enrolled in the study of philosophy and theology at the Catholic Faculty of Theology at the University of Zagreb.

After his first year of studies, he began his novitiate at the Monastery of St. Michael in Zadar on August 2, 1986, and made his first vows at the Monastery of St. John the Baptist in Zadar on August 2, 1987.He continued his philosophy and theology studies at the Catholic Faculty of Theology in Zagreb, graduating in February 1993. On the feast of St. Francis of Assisi, October 4, 1990, he professed his solemn vows in the monastery chapel in Odra, Zagreb.

He was ordained a deacon by Cardinal Franjo Kuharić, Archbishop of Zagreb, on October 13, 1991, in the Zagreb Cathedral, and ordained a priest by Bishop Srećko Badurina of Šibenik on June 28, 1992, at the Church of St. Francis Xavier in Zagreb.

He began his pastoral ministry in the Parish of St. Joseph the Worker in Belišće, first as a deacon and then as parochial vicar, while also serving as a catechist at Ivan Kukuljević Primary School.In July 1993, he was assigned as parochial vicar to the Parish of the Holy Family in Split, where he also served as a catechist at Bol Primary School.

From 2001 to 2005, he served as superior of the monastery and parish priest at the Parish of St. John the Baptist in Zadar, and from 2005 to 2009, he held the same role at the Parish of St. Francis Xavier in Zagreb.

Afterward, he pursued graduate studies in Rome, earning a licentiate in pastoral theology from the Pontifical Lateran University in 2011.Upon returning from Rome, from 2011 to 2013, he served again as parochial vicar at the Parish of St. John the Baptist in Zadar.

From 2013 to 2017, he was superior and formator at the Minor Seminary of St. Joseph Monastery in Split, parish priest of the Parish of the Holy Family in Split, and local and regional assistant of the Secular Franciscan Order (OFS).During his ministry in Split, he was also a member of the Presbyteral Council of the Archdiocese of Split-Makarska.

He served as a member of the Provincial Council from 2005 to 2009 and again from 2011 to 2013.

In 2017, he was elected Provincial Minister of the Third Order Regular of St. Francis in Croatia.

== Episcopate ==
While serving as Provincial Minister, he was appointed Bishop of Požega by Pope Francis on March 11, 2024, following the acceptance of the resignation of Msgr. Antun Škvorčević, who had reached the canonical age limit.
