= Religious architecture in Belgrade =

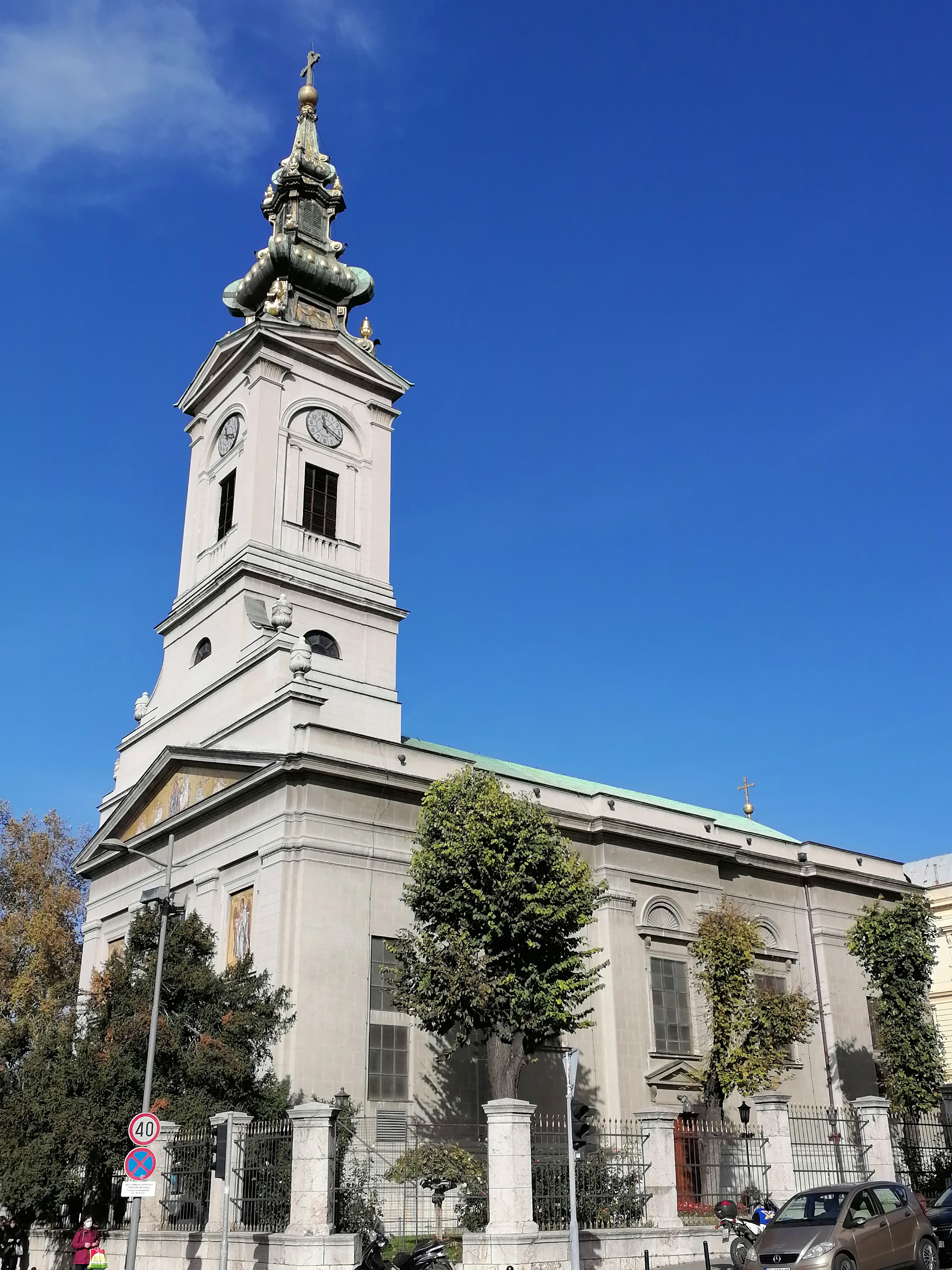
Cathedral of Saint Archangel Michael, the Eastern Orthodox cathedral

Belgrade, the capital and largest city of Serbia, has an abundance of religious architecture. The city has numerous Serbian Orthodox churches and temples and is also the seat of the Patriarch of the Serbian Orthodox Church. Its two most prominent Orthodox Christian places of worship are the Cathedral of Saint Archangel Michael and the Church of Saint Sava, one of the largest Eastern Orthodox church in the world.

Other notable Belgrade churches include Church of Saint Mark, in which rests the body of the first Serbian Emperor, Stefan Dušan. The architecture of this church was greatly inspired by the Gračanica monastery in the province of Kosovo. The church of Sveta Ružica in the Kalemegdan Fortress is one of the holiest places in Belgrade for Serbian Orthodox Christians since this was the site where the body of St. Paraskeva was preserved for several years after the Ottoman conquest, before being taken to Romania where it still rests today.

Belgrade is the seat of a Catholic archdiocese, with a small Catholic community and several Catholic churches. One of these, St Anthony's, was designed by the noted Slovenian architect Jože Plečnik.

The Bajrakli Mosque, built in 1526 by the Ottoman Sultan Suleiman the Magnificent, is one of the oldest surviving structures in contemporary Belgrade.

The Jewish community is served by the Belgrade Synagogue, which is the only currently active Jewish place of worship in the entire country, although not the only structure within the city limits.

Belgrade also had an active Buddhist temple in the first half of the 20th century. It was built by Kalmyk expatriates fleeing the outcome of the Bolshevik Revolution of 1917.

== Eastern Orthodox ==
- Cathedral of Saint Archangel Michael, Stari Grad
- Church of Saint Sava, Vračar
- Church of Saint Mark, Palilula
- Church of the Ascension, Savski Venac
- Church of St. Alexander Nevsky, Stari Grad
- Church of St. Basil of Ostrog, New Belgrade
- Church of St. George, Čukarica
- Church of the Holy Apostles Peter and Paul, Savski Venac
- Church of the Nativity of the Theotokos, Zemun
- Ružica Church, Stari Grad
- Chapel of Saint Petka, Stari Grad
- Russian Orthodox Church of the Holy Trinity, Palilula
- Rakovica Monastery, Rakovica
- Monastery of St. Archangel Gabriel, Zemun

== Roman Catholic ==
- Cathedral of the Blessed Virgin Mary, Vračar
- Co-cathedral of Christ the King, Vračar
- Church of St. Anthony of Padua, Zvezda

== Protestant ==
- Evangelical Church, Zemun

== Islam ==
- Bajrakli Mosque, Stari Grad

== Judaism ==
- Belgrade Synagogue, Stari Grad
- Zemun Synagogue, Zemun

== See also ==
- Architecture of Serbia
