= List of cathedrals in Serbia =

This is the list of cathedrals in Serbia sorted by denomination.

== Eastern Orthodox ==
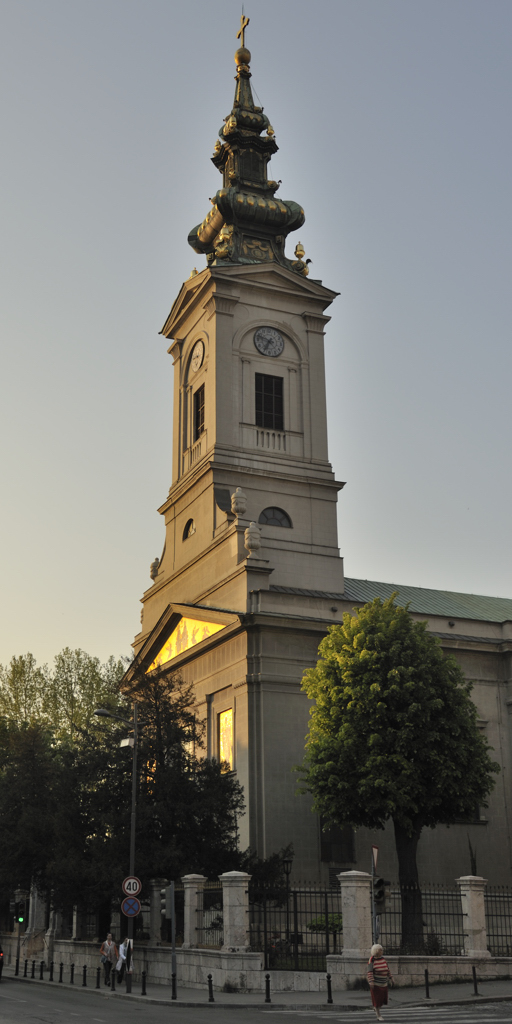
Cathedral of Saint Archangel Michael in Belgrade

Cathedrals of the Serbian Orthodox Church:

- Cathedral of Archangels Michael and Gabriel in Požarevac (Eparchy of Braničevo)
- Cathedral of the Dormition of the Theotokos in Kragujevac (Eparchy of Šumadija)
- Cathedral of Nativity of the Theotokos in Zaječar (Eparchy of Timok)
- Cathedral of Resurrection of the Lord in Valjevo (Eparchy of Valjevo)
- Cathedral of Saint Archangel Michael in Belgrade (Archdiocese of Belgrade and Karlovci)
- Holy Trinity Cathedral in Kraljevo (Eparchy of Žiča)
- Holy Trinity Cathedral in Niš (Eparchy of Niš)
- Holy Trinity Cathedral in Vranje (Eparchy of Vranje)
- Saint Basil of Ostrog Cathedral in Prijepolje (Eparchy of Mileševa)
- Saint George Cathedral in Kruševac (Eparchy of Kruševac)
- Saint George Cathedral in Novi Sad (Eparchy of Bačka)
- Saint Nicholas Cathedral in Sremski Karlovci (Eparchy of Srem)
- Saint Nicholas Cathedral in Vršac (Eparchy of Banat)
- Saints Peter and Paul Cathedral in Šabac (Eparchy of Šabac)

Cathedral of the Romanian Orthodox Church:

- Cathedral of Ascension of the Ascension of the Lord in Vršac (Diocese of Dacia Felix)

== Roman Catholic ==
Cathedrals of the Roman Catholic Church in Serbia:

- Cathedral of the Blessed Virgin Mary in Belgrade (Archdiocese of Belgrade)
- Cathedral of Saint Demetrius in Sremska Mitrovica (Diocese of Srijem)
- Cathedral of Saint John of Nepomuk in Zrenjanin (Diocese of Zrenjanin)
- Cathedral of Saint Theresa of Avila in Subotica (Diocese of Subotica)
- Co-Cathedral of Christ the King in Belgrade (Archdiocese of Belgrade)

== Eastern Catholic ==
Cathedral of the Greek Catholic Church in Serbia:

- Saint Nicholas Cathedral in Ruski Krstur (Greek Catholic Eparchy of Ruski Krstur)

== See also ==
- List of cathedrals
