= Toša Apostolović =

Serbian merchant

Teodor Toša Apostolović (Serbian Cyrillic: Тоша Апостоловић; a village near Thessaloniki, 1745 - Zemun, 1810) was a Serbian merchant and philanthropist.

== Biography ==
When the Austrians withdrew from Belgrade, between 1765 and 1770, Teodor Apostolović, a Serb from Southern Serbia, moved to Zemun with them and did not want to remain under the Turkish rule. He was born in the vicinity of Thessaloniki in 1745. Some chroniclers say that he was of Greek origin and that his name was Theodoros Apostolos, which he changed with his arrival. He was a wax worker, a manufacturer of soap and candles, and thanks to his skills, he earned a great fortune. He became a respectable citizen and philanthropist, a church counselor, and was the president of the Zemun church community when Zemun had 6,000 inhabitants. In 1786, he built the Church of the Holy Archangel Gabriel, which became a monastery in 1990. He was also a close friend of Hadži Ruvim and contributed financially to Karađorđe's Serbia.

As he got older, he contracted eye disease which made him unable to distinguish silver from gold bars while buying from a Russian merchant. He went to the churches and prayed to Saint Nicholas to restore his vision. According to legend, one night Saint Nicholas appeared in his dream, who told him to go to a Belgrade suburb, Bežanijska kosa, and bring with him an empty, voluminous barrel and roll it downhill. Wherever it stops, he must dig a well and plant trees around it, so that he can wash with water from the well in order to regain his sight. He did as he was told in a dream, dug a well and even built a tavern next to it. Indeed, the water from the well possessed curative properties and Toša's vision was restored.

Shortly after the well was built, it became a favorite picnic spot for the people of Zemun, and the entire area around the well was named "Toša's well" during Toša Apostolović's lifetime. Immediately before his death, he bequeathed the vineyard land and the well to the National Church.

He died in 1810 in Zemun.
