= Church of St. John the Baptist, Stevanac =

Church of St. John the Baptist
- Црква светог Јована Крститеља
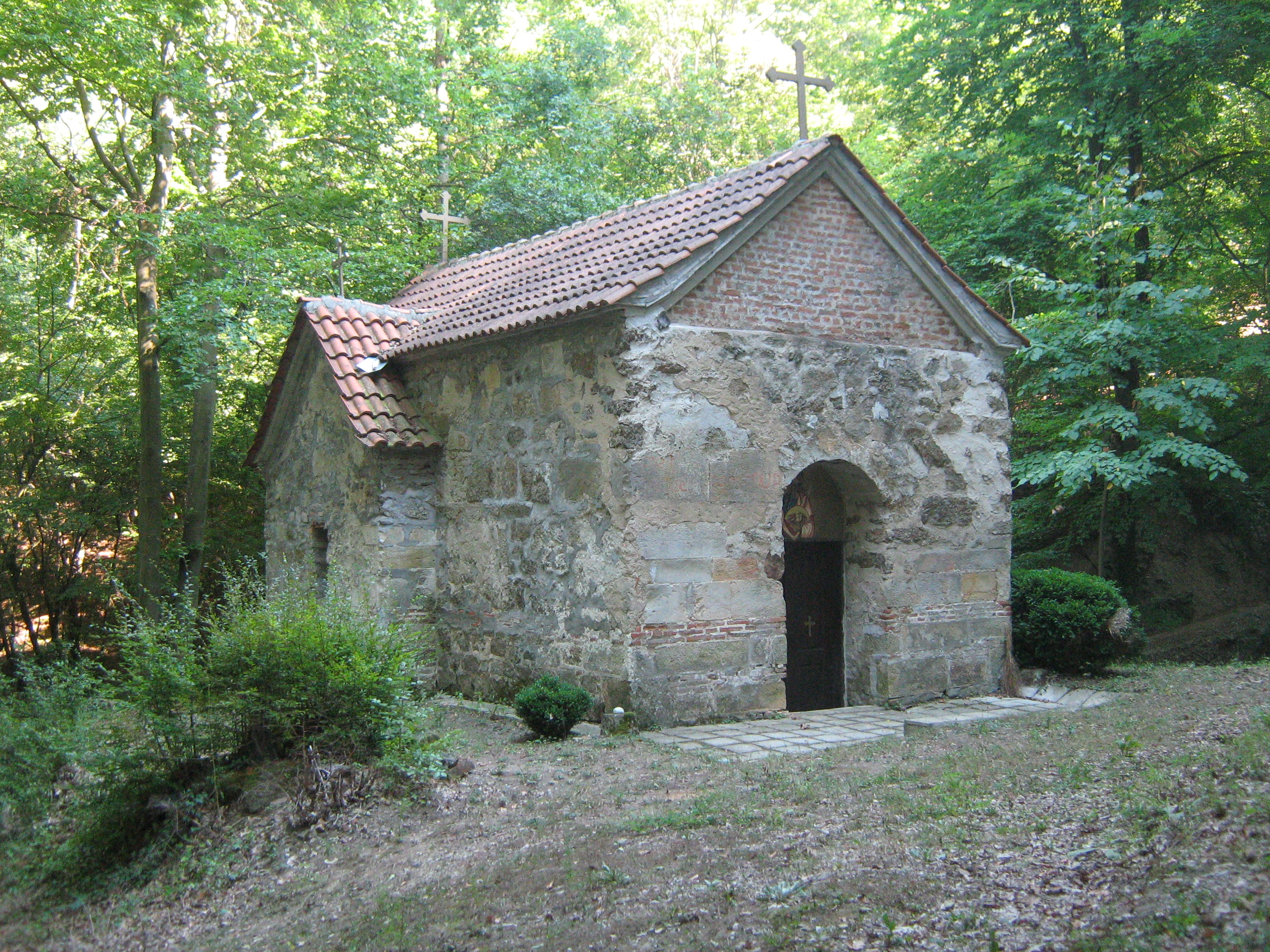
- Church of St. John the Baptist
- Church of St. John the Baptist
- Location: Stevanac, Ćićevac

Cultural Heritage of Serbia
- Type: Cultural Monument of Great Importance
- Designated: 1983
- Reference no.: СК 127
- Country: Serbia
- Denomination: Serbian Orthodox

History
- Status: Church
- Dedication: John the Baptist

Architecture
- Functional status: Active
- Years built: 15th century

Administration
- Archdiocese: Eparchy of Kruševac

The Church of St. John the Baptist in Stevanac, Ćićevac dedicated to St. John the Baptist, was constructed in 15th century. The church, now in ruins, is located near the confluence of the South and West Morava Rivers, on the left bank of the South Morava. Although it was originally adorned with frescoes, only traces remain today. The church is associated with the Raška architectural school, but no historical records precisely date its construction. The historical period in which the building was constructed is approximated in period between the Ottoman conquest of medieval Serbia to the Great Serbian Migration.

== See also ==
- Eparchy of Kruševac
