= Josip Ujčić =

Archbishop of Belgrade (1880–1964)

Monsignor Josip Ujčić
- Archbishop of Belgrade
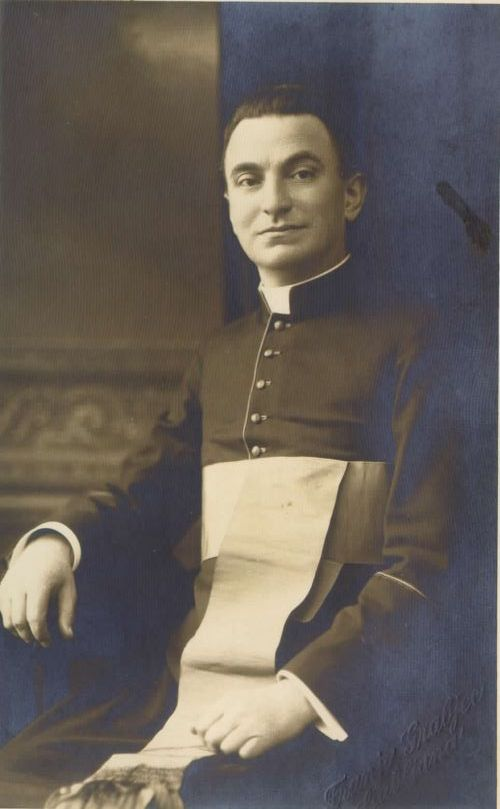
- Ujčič in 1929
- Church: Roman Catholic Church
- Archdiocese: Belgrade
- Appointed: 1936
- Term ended: 1964
- Predecessor: Ivan Rafael Rodić
- Successor: Gabrijel Bukatko

Orders
- Ordination: 27 July 1902 (Priest)
- Consecration: 7 March 1937 (Bishop) by Antun Bauer

Personal details
- Born: February 10, 1880 Stari Pazin, Austrian Littoral, Austria-Hungary
- Died: March 24, 1964 (aged 84) Belgrade, Yugoslavia
- Buried: Church of Christ the King, Belgrade

Josip Ujčić (10 February 1880 – 24 March 1964) was a Croatian (and later Yugoslavian) prelate of the Roman Catholic Church. He was the Archbishop of Belgrade, Apostolic Administrator of Banat, Council Father and a member of the Central Preparatory Commission of the Second Vatican Council.

== Biography ==
Josip Ujčić was born on February 10, 1880, in Stari Pazin to Anton Ujčić and Katarina Ladavac. Ujčić was born into a rural family. He attended elementary school in Tinjan, and graduated from the state grammar school in Trieste. He completed theological college in Gorizia and became a priest in 1902. After his ordination, he continued to study theology in Vienna, and received his doctorate with the dissertation Historia glagolicae speciali cum respectu ad decreta pontificia. After receiving his doctorate he began teaching at the Theological Seminary in Gorizia, and from 1912 to 1919 he was director of the Augustineum Institute and professor at the Vienna Faculty of Catholic Theology, then professor of moral theology at Ljubljana's Faculty of theology until 1936. He was the institute's dean from 1934 to 1935.

Ujčić was ordained a bishop in Zagreb on 7 March 1937. He was appointed Archbishop of Belgrade and Apostolic Administration of Banat. In the difficult inter-war and World War II period, he helped the Catholic faithful of his archdiocese. He was president of the Bishops' Conference of Yugoslavia (1948-1961). He interceded for the regulation of relations between church and state, and participated in the preparation and work of the Second Vatican Council. He died near the end of the council on March 24, 1964.

According to Belgrade Archbishop and Metropolitan Stanislav Hočevar, Archbishop Ujčić, who has been in Belgrade for almost 28 years, never met with the Patriarch of the Serbian Orthodox Church, the dominant religious community in Serbia, which was strange at the time because of the strong ecumenical work of his predecessor, Rafael Rodić, the first Archbishop of Belgrade, and also Croat by origin.

Ujčić was buried in the Belgrade Church of Christ the King. He was awarded the state decoration in 1960. On the occasion of the 53rd anniversary of his death, a memorial plaque dedicated to him was unveiled in the Church of Christ the King in Belgrade.

== Sources ==
- Dimić, Ljubodrag; Žutić, Nikola (1992). Roman Catholic clericalism in the Kingdom of Yugoslavia 1918-1941: Contributions to history. Beograd: Vojnoizdavački i novinski centar.
- Radić, Radmila (2014). ""Yugoslavia and the Vatican 1918-1992. years "" (PDF). Annales: Anali za istrske in mediteranske študije. 24 (4): 691–702.
- "Ujčić, Josip, nadškof (1880–1964) - Slovenska biografija". www.slovenska-biografija.si (in Slovenian).
- ""Po meni si rođen plodovima" (Hoš 14,9) | Beogradska nadbiskupija" (in Croatian). 28 March 2017.

Catholic Church titles
Preceded by Ivan Rafael Rodić	Roman Catholic Archdiocese of Belgrade; 1936–1964	Succeeded by Gabrijel Bukatko
Preceded by Ivan Rafael Rodić	Apostolic Administration of Banat; 1936–1964 (as Apostolic Administrator)	Succeeded by Gabrijel Bukatko
