= Ivan Rafael Rodić =

Roman Catholic archbishop

Ivan Rafael Rodić O.F.M.
- Archbishop of Belgrade (-Smederevo)
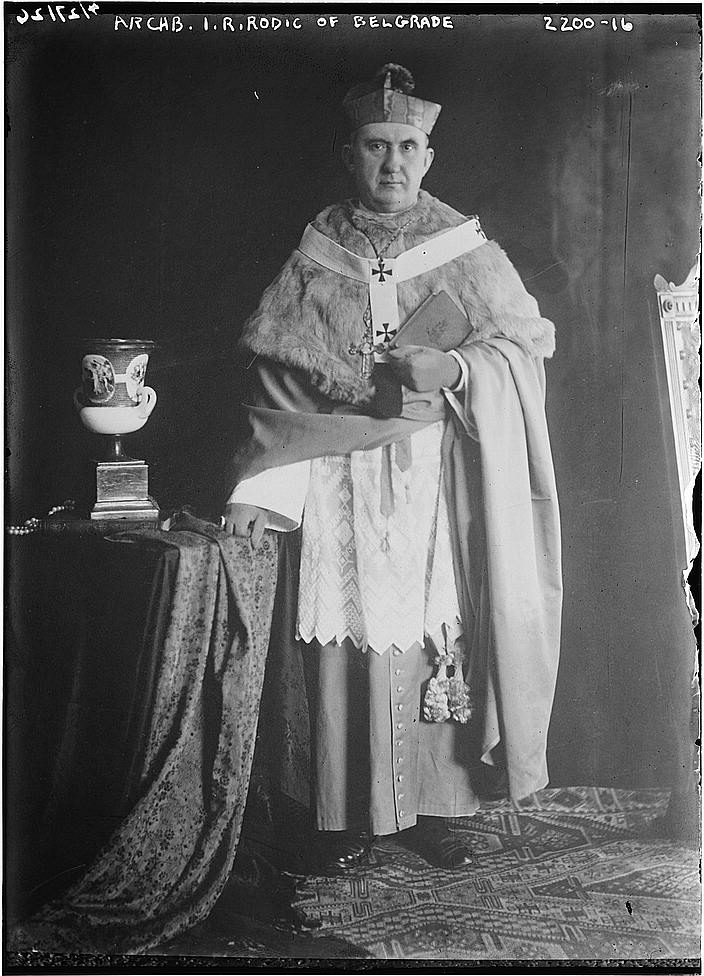
- Church: Catholic Church
- Archdiocese: Archdiocese of Belgrade (-Smederevo)
- In office: 29 October 1924 – 28 November 1936
- Predecessor: Vjenceslav Šoić
- Successor: Josip Ujčić
- Other post: Titular Archbishop of Philippopolis in Thracia (1936-1954)
- Previous post: Apostolic Administrator of Srpski Banat (1923-1936)

Orders
- Ordination: 23 July 1893 by Anton Josef Gruscha
- Consecration: 7 December 1924 by Ermenegildo Pellegrinetti

Personal details
- Born: 15 June 1870 Nurkovac, Kingdom of Croatia-Slavonia, Transleithania, Austria-Hungary
- Died: 10 May 1954 (aged 83) Požega, PR Croatia, FSR Yugoslavia

Archbishop Ivan Rafael Rodić, O.F.M. (also Ivo Rodić, Italian: Giovanni Raffaele Rodic; 15 June 1870 – 10 May 1954) was a Croatian Franciscan prelate, who served as the first Archbishop of the Roman Catholic Archdiocese of Belgrade-Smederevo between 1924 and 1936.

== Biography ==
Rodić was born on 15 June 1870, in the village of Nurkovac, at the time in the Kingdom of Croatia-Slavonia. As a Franciscan, he graduated from the Vienna University of Theology and started teaching theology in Baja, Hungary in 1893, where he remained until 1898.

He became the Abbot of the Franciscan monastery in Vienna, and the provincial minister of several monasteries in Croatia. Between 1881 and 1884, he was the provincial of the Province of St. John of Capistrano that included Slavonia, Syrmia and much of southern Hungary. In 1884, Rodić in his capacity as provincial declined the request of Ivan Antunović to help start a newspaper for the Bunjevci Croats in Bačka, fearing opposition from higher authorities, but supported his cause - using their native language and relaying them news from Croatia. Antunović did nevertheless manage to start the newspaper, Neven, and eventually in 1909 Rodić contributed several articles to it.

He later served as the visitor general of the Order, travelling to numerous monasteries in Europe and America.

On 10 February 1923, Rodić became the apostolic administrator of the newly created administration of Banat and moved to Veliki Bečkerek (today Zrenjanin, Serbia). The following year, on 29 October 1924, he was named the archbishop of Belgrade-Smederevo.

On 28 November 1936, he was replaced as an archbishop of Belgrade and instead became the titular archbishop of Philippopolis in Thracia. He died on 10 May 1954, in Požega.

Catholic Church titles
Preceded by New creation	Roman Catholic Archdiocese of Belgrade; 1924–1936	Succeeded by Josip Ujčić
Preceded by New creation	Apostolic Administration of Banat; 1923–1936 (as Apostolic Administrator)	Succeeded by Josip Ujčić
