= Saint George Cathedral, Kruševac =

Cathedral in Kruševac, Serbia

Saint George Cathedral
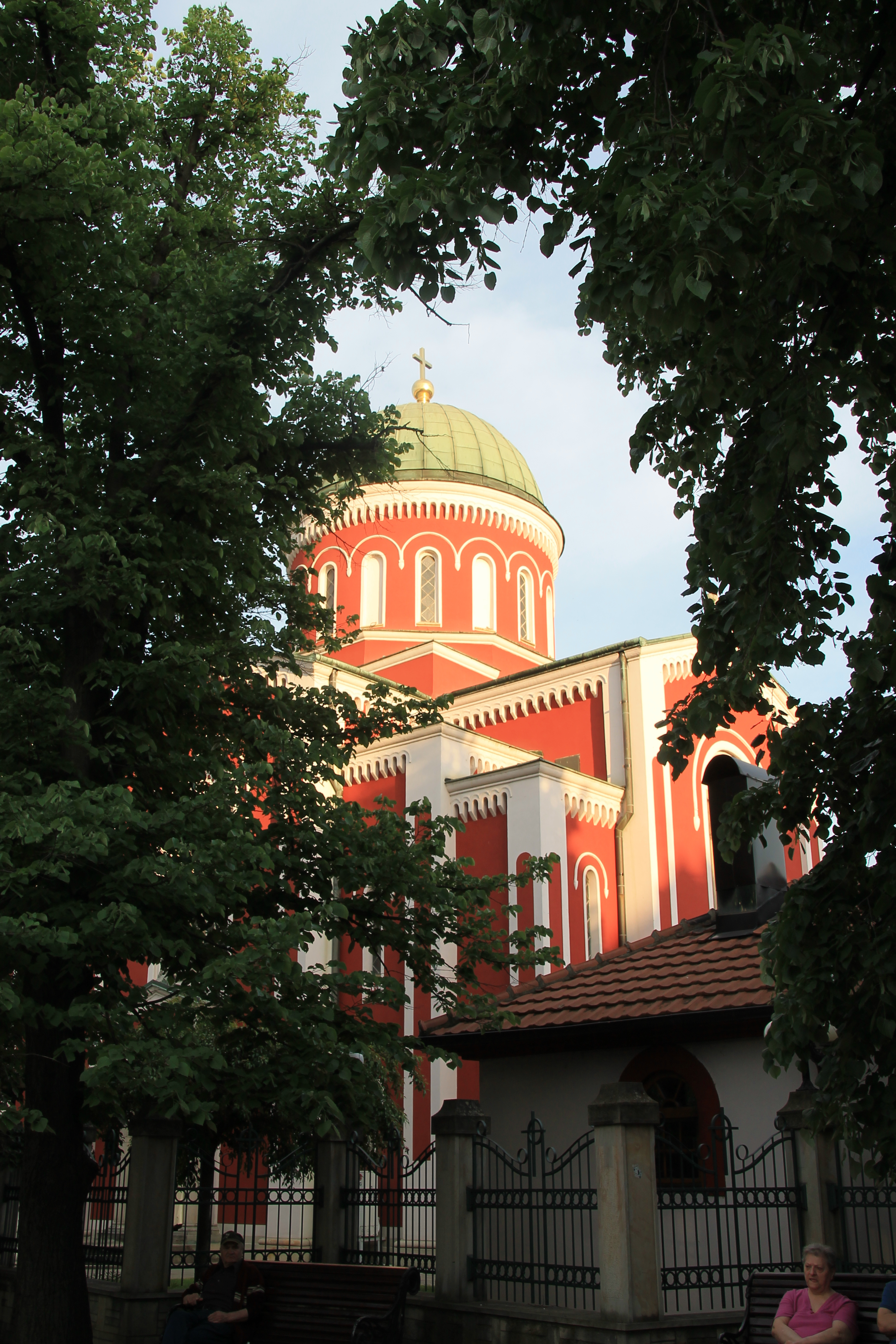
- Saint George Cathedral, pictured in 2025
- Saint George Cathedral
- 43.5791°N 21.3317°E
- Location: Kruševac
- Country: Serbia
- Denomination: Serbian Orthodox Church

History
- Status: Church
- Dedication: Saint George

Architecture
- Functional status: Active
- Style: Serbian-Byzantine (with Moravian school influence)
- Years built: XIX century

Administration
- Archdiocese: Eparchy of Kruševac

The Saint George Cathedral (Serbian: Саборна црква Cветог Георгија, romanized: Saborna crkva Svetog Georgija) is an Eastern Orthodox church located in Kruševac, Serbia. It is under jurisdiction of the Eparchy of Kruševac of the Serbian Orthodox Church and serves as its cathedral church.

The church claims to house relics of Saint George, Sinai Martyrs, Surdulica Martyrs, Saint Nectarios of Aegina, and other saints, as well as fragments of the Holy Cross.

== History ==
Before liberation from the Ottoman Empire, Kruševac had two places of worship: the Lazarica Church and a small church located where the current Church of Saint George now stands. The latter served Serbs when Lazarica was used as an Ottoman warehouse. The exact date of its construction is unknown, but it was mentioned by one Austrian officer in 1788 as a well-built building. The small church was likely demolished in 1838 and replaced by another small church, which was also demolished to make way for the current Church of Saint George.

The earliest records regarding the new Saint George Cathedral date back to 1865, when land was purchased from local residents Stojan Petrović, Alekse Marić, and Živko Ilić for 362 imperial ducats. Due to difficulties in paying for the land, construction was delayed by two decades. Building finally commenced in 1885, and by 1898, the church was completed and roofed. The cathedral was designed by architect Dušan Živanović in the Serbian-Byzantine style, with polychrome façades inspired by the Moravian School of architecture. Three bells were purchased in 1902, with the expenditure approved by the Ministry of Education and Religious Affairs. The iconostasis was commissioned on February 5, 1903, featuring intricate wood carvings and icons.

The fresco painting of the dome in the Saint George Cathedral was completed only shortly before Easter 2015. The church had been waiting for a hundred years to complete its interior frescoes. The fresco work was done by academic painter Radan Radojlović, marking the church in Kruševac 27th church he has contributed to. His work follows that of Milan Milovanović, a painter who created icons for the church's iconostasis in the early 20th century.

== See also ==
- List of cathedrals in Serbia
