= Co-cathedral of Christ the King, Belgrade =

Co-cathedral in Belgrade, Serbia

Coordinates: 44.807°N 20.467°E

Co-cathedral of Christ the King
- Конкатедрала Криста Краља
- Konkatedrala Krista Kralja
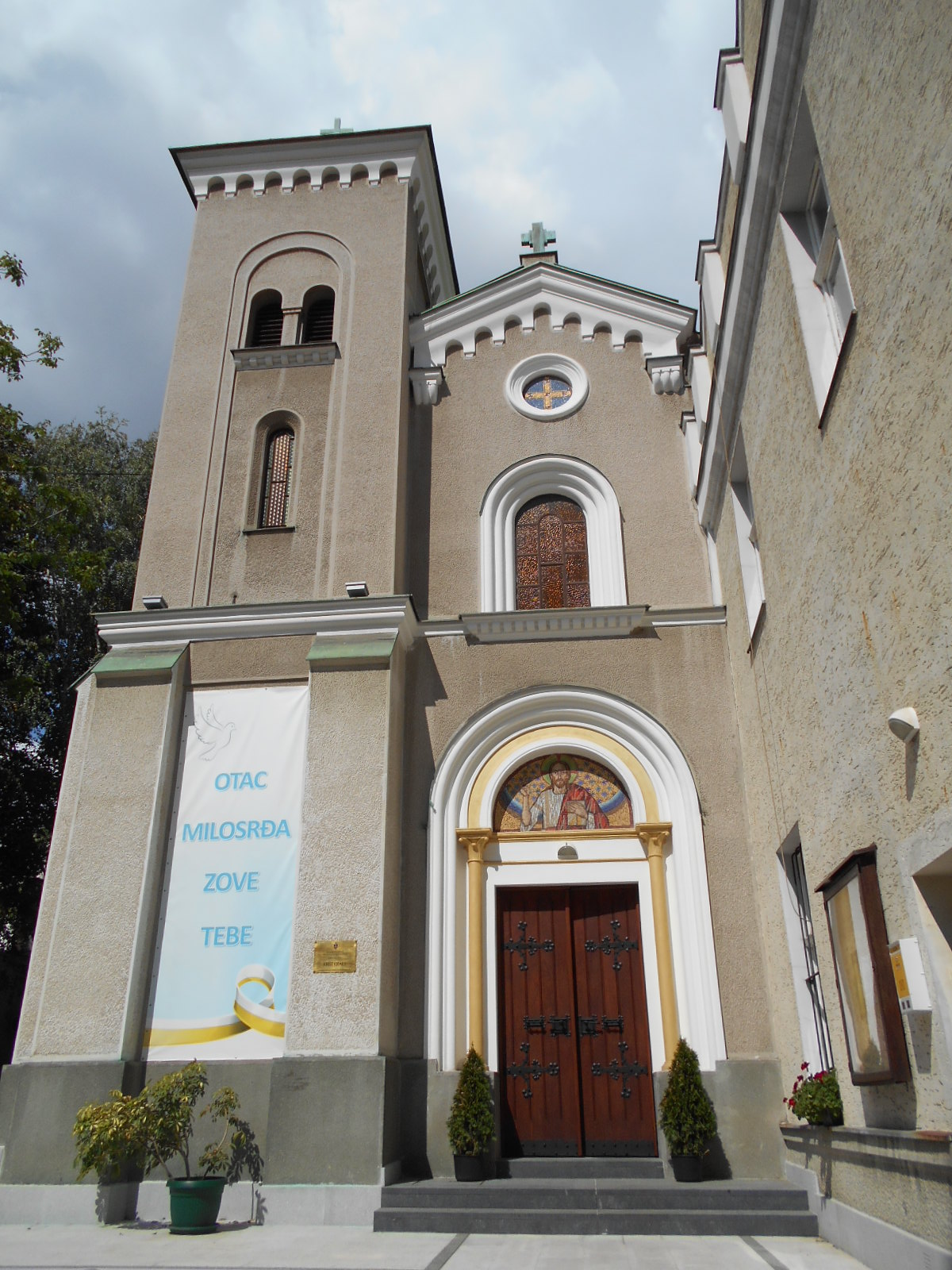
- Co-cathedral of Christ the King, pictured in 2016
- Co-cathedral of Christ the King
- Location: Krunska 23, Belgrade
- Country: Serbia
- Denomination: Roman Catholic Church

Architecture
- Groundbreaking: 1924
- Completed: 1926

Administration
- Archdiocese: Archdiocese of Belgrade

The Co-cathedral of Christ the King (Serbian: Конкатедрала Криста Краља, romanized: Konkatedrala Krista Kralja) is the Roman Catholic church in Belgrade, Serbia. It is under jurisdiction of the Archdiocese of Belgrade and serves as its co-cathedral church.

== History ==
The Co-Cathedral of Christ the King is the oldest Catholic place of worship of Belgrade. Its construction began in 1924: in fact, since 1914 the negotiations were taking place between the Holy See and the Serbian government for the construction of a church. The new church, dedicated to St. Ladislaus, was solemnly consecrated by the Apostolic Nuncio Pellegrinetti in 1924 and elevated to the rank of cathedral of the newly-established Archdiocese of Belgrade. In 1926, the church was expanded and reached its current size, was also dedicated to Christ the King next year, were installed the new pipe organ and bells. Between 1966 and 1971, a period in which Ciril Zajec was cathedral’s vicar, were expanded local parish and the presbytery was converted to the new liturgical norms dictated by the Second Vatican Council. Since 1988, when the new Cathedral of the Blessed Virgin Mary was built and consecrated, to the Church of Christ the King was assigned the title of co-cathedral and is nowadays mainly used for diplomatic meetings, requiem Masses and interreligious meetings.

== Architecture ==
The church is preceded by a small churchyard surrounded by a wrought iron gate onto which both the church and the rectory. The façade of the church of Christ the King is divided into two sections by a horizontal cornice in stucco: the lower is the portal, supported by two Corinthian columns and topped by a lunette mosaic depicting Christ Blessing; in the upper one, there are the window with round arch and cornice supported by two shelves decorated with a pattern hanging arches. To the left of the facade of the church, there is a bell tower with a belfry with three mullioned windows that opens to the outside. To the right of the church, however, is the rectory, on two floors, with four rectangular windows on the facade.

The interior of the Co-cathedral of Christ the King has three naves covered with a barrel vault. Along them, above the band in white Carrara marble, are wooden Stations of the Cross and stained-glass windows with scenes from the life of Jesus and Mary. At the bottom of two side aisles is the transept, which ends with two semicircular apses protruding slightly. In it are altars dedicated to Saint Joseph (right altar) and Our Lady of Lourdes (left altar), also used for the custody of the Blessed Sacrament. The presbytery has fully restored to its present post-conciliar 1960s, led by the architect Augusto Ranocchi. Along the central axis, are the main altar and the marble bishop's throne. The apse is decorated with a modern mosaic depicting "Christ the King."

In the choir loft located on the central portal, is the pipe organ, built in 1927 by Franc Jenko. It has 14 stops placed on two keyboards and a pedal keyboard.

Manual I, Great
Principal	8′
Gamba	8′
Salicional	8′
Burdon	8′
Oktava	4′
Koncert Viola	8′
Mikstura	1^{1}/_{2}′

Manual II, Positiv
Konic Flavta	8′
Dolce	8′
Vox Celeste	8′
Trav. Flavta	4′

Pedal
Subbass	16′
Burdonbass	8′
Oktav Bass	4′

== See also ==
- Catholic Church in Serbia
- List of cathedrals in Serbia
