= Roman Catholic Archdiocese of Belgrade =

Roman Catholic archdiocese in Serbia

Coordinates: 44.7943°N 20.4752°E

Metropolitan Archdiocese of Belgrade Archidioecesis Metropolitae Belogradensis Београдска надбискупија и митрополија Beogradska nadbiskupija i metropolija

Catholic
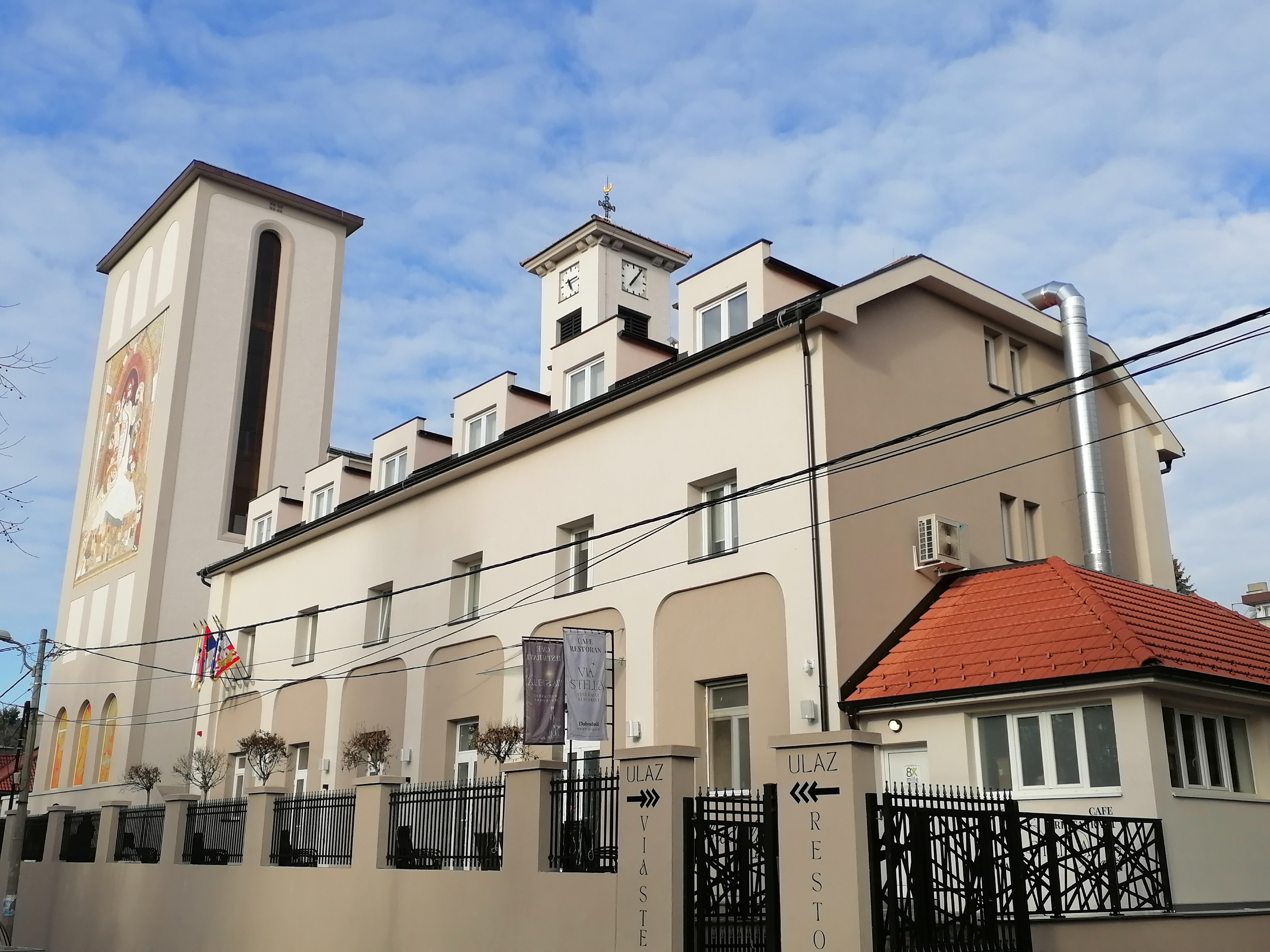
- Cathedral of the Blessed Virgin Mary, Belgrade

Location
- Country: Serbia

Statistics
- Area: 55,661 km^{2} (21,491 sq mi)
- Population: Total; Catholics: (as of 2022); ▼4,683,413; ▼11,812 (▼0.2%)

Information
- Denomination: Catholic
- Sui iuris church: Latin Church
- Rite: Roman Rite
- Established: 9th century
- Cathedral: Cathedral of the Blessed Virgin Mary, Belgrade
- Co-cathedral: Co-cathedral of Christ the King, Belgrade

Current leadership
- Pope: Leo XIV
- Archbishop: Cardinal Ladislav Nemet
- Metropolitan Archbishop: Cardinal Ladislav Nemet
- Bishops emeritus: Stanislav Hočevar

Map
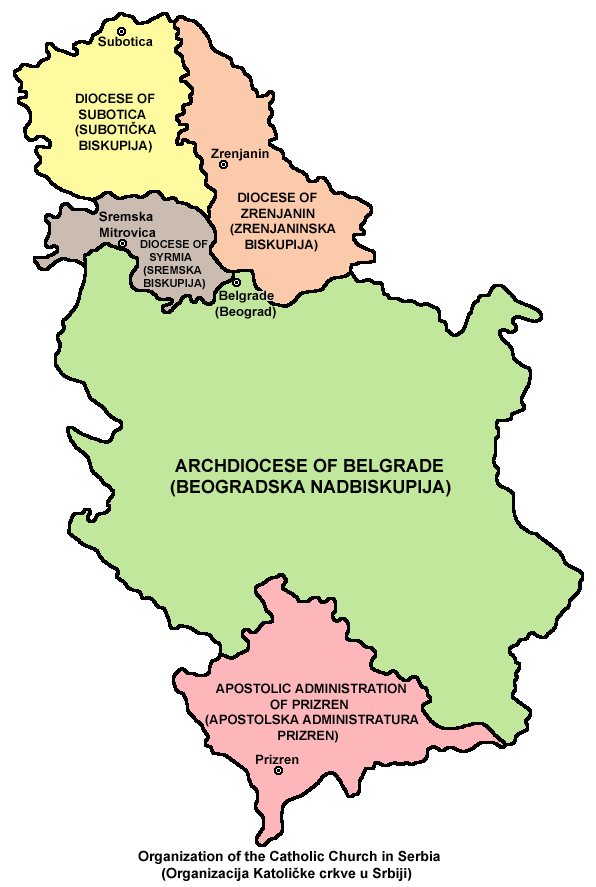

Website
- kc.org.rs

The Metropolitan Archdiocese of Belgrade (Latin: Archidioecesis Metropolitae Belogradensis; Serbian: Београдска надбискупија и митрополија; Croatian: Beogradska nadbiskupija i metropolija) is the Latin Church archdiocese of the Catholic Church in Serbia, covering Central Serbia. (Note: Within Belgrade, its jurisdiction covers the administrative territory of the City of Belgrade, except for the municipalities of Zemun and Surčin.)

The episcopal see is located at the Cathedral of the Blessed Virgin Mary while its headquarters are located at the Episcopal Palace at Svetozara Markovića Street.

== History ==
In the 13th century, the Diocese of Syrmia was established, for Catholics in the most southern regions of the Kingdom of Hungary, including Belgrade. By the 15th century, attempts were made to establish a Roman Catholic diocese for the regions of Belgrade and Smederevo, but in 1521 the city (Belgrade) fell under Ottoman rule. In 1717, the Habsburg Monarchy captured Belgrade from the Ottoman Empire, and soon the Treaty of Passarowitz was concluded (1718), officially assigning Belgrade with much of central Serbia to the Habsburgs. State authorities implemented complex religious policies towards various Christian communities, by recognizing the Serbian Orthodox Metropolitanate of Belgrade and also establishing the Roman Catholic Diocese of Belgrade. After the loss of Belgrade to the Ottomans in 1739, many Catholics left the region, and the Diocese was returned to the state of provisional administration, that would continue up to the beginning of the 20th century.

In order to regulate the status of the local Catholic Church, the government of the Kingdom of Serbia concluded an official Concordat with the Holy See in 1914. By the Article 2 of the Concordat, it was decided that a regular Catholic Archdiocese of Belgrade should be created. Because of the breakout of the World War I, those provisions could not be implemented, and only after 1918 were new arrangements made and promoted to Archdiocese of Belgrade (in 1924) and Metropolitan Archdiocese of Belgrade (in 1986).

== Ordinaries ==
Bishops

- Jozef Ignác de Vilt (22 December 1800 – 26 August 1806)
- Stefan Cech (26 September 1814 – 8 January 1821)
- Venceslao Soic (23 December 1858 – 8 January 1869)
- Giovanni Paolesic (4 July 1871 – 1893)

Archbishops

- Ivan Rafael Rodić, OFM (29 October 1924 – 28 November 1936)
- Josip Ujčić (28 November 1936 – 24 March 1964)
- Gabrijel Bukatko (24 March 1964 – 4 March 1980)
- Alojz Turk (4 March 1980 – 16 December 1986)
- Franc Perko (16 December 1986 – 31 March 2001)
- Stanislav Hočevar, SDB (31 March 2001 – 5 November 2022)
- Ladislav Nemet, SVD (5 November 2022 – present) (cardinal in 2025)

== Suffragan dioceses ==
- Diocese of Subotica
- Diocese of Zrenjanin

== Gallery ==
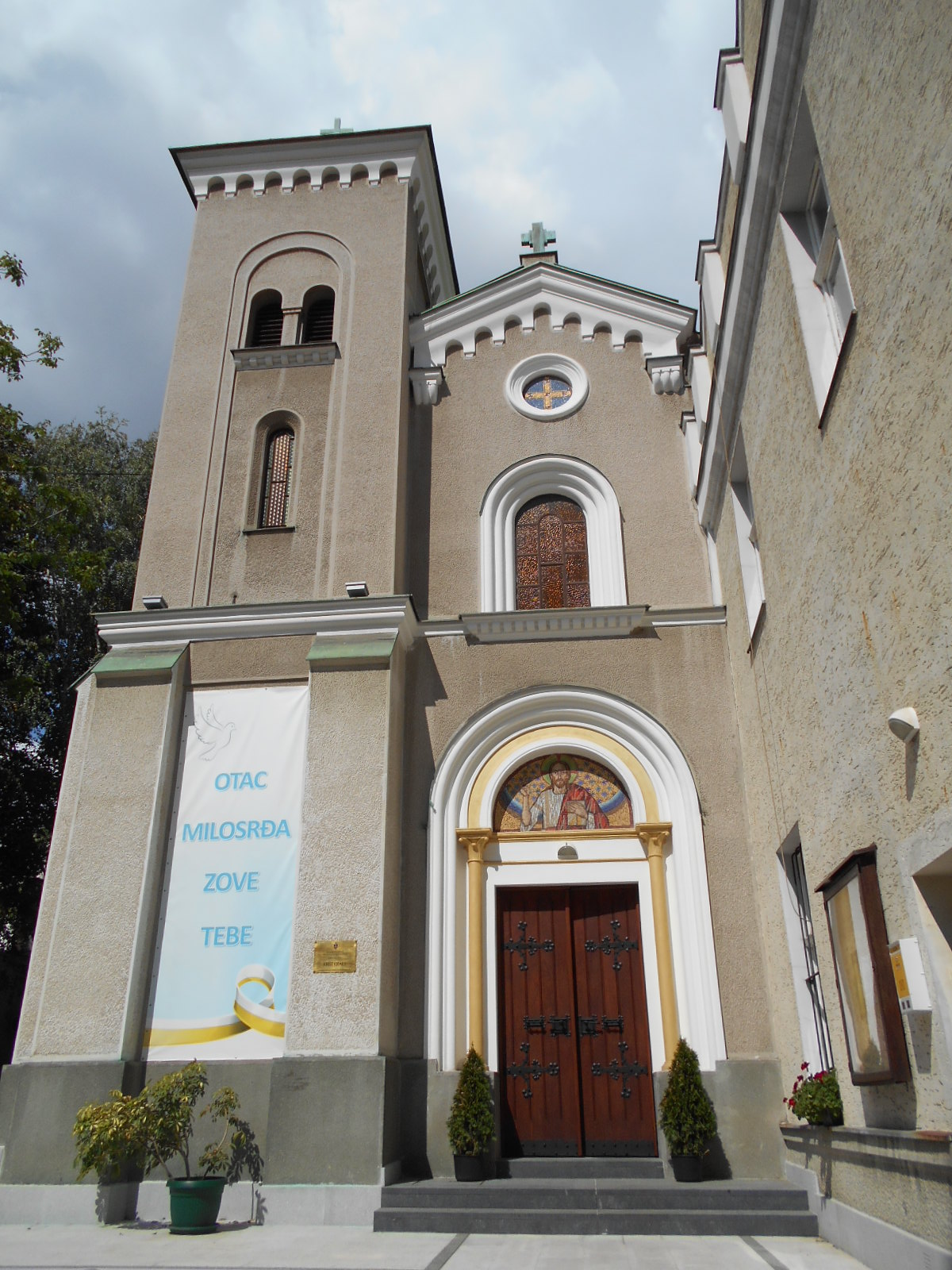
Co-cathedral of Christ the King in Belgrade

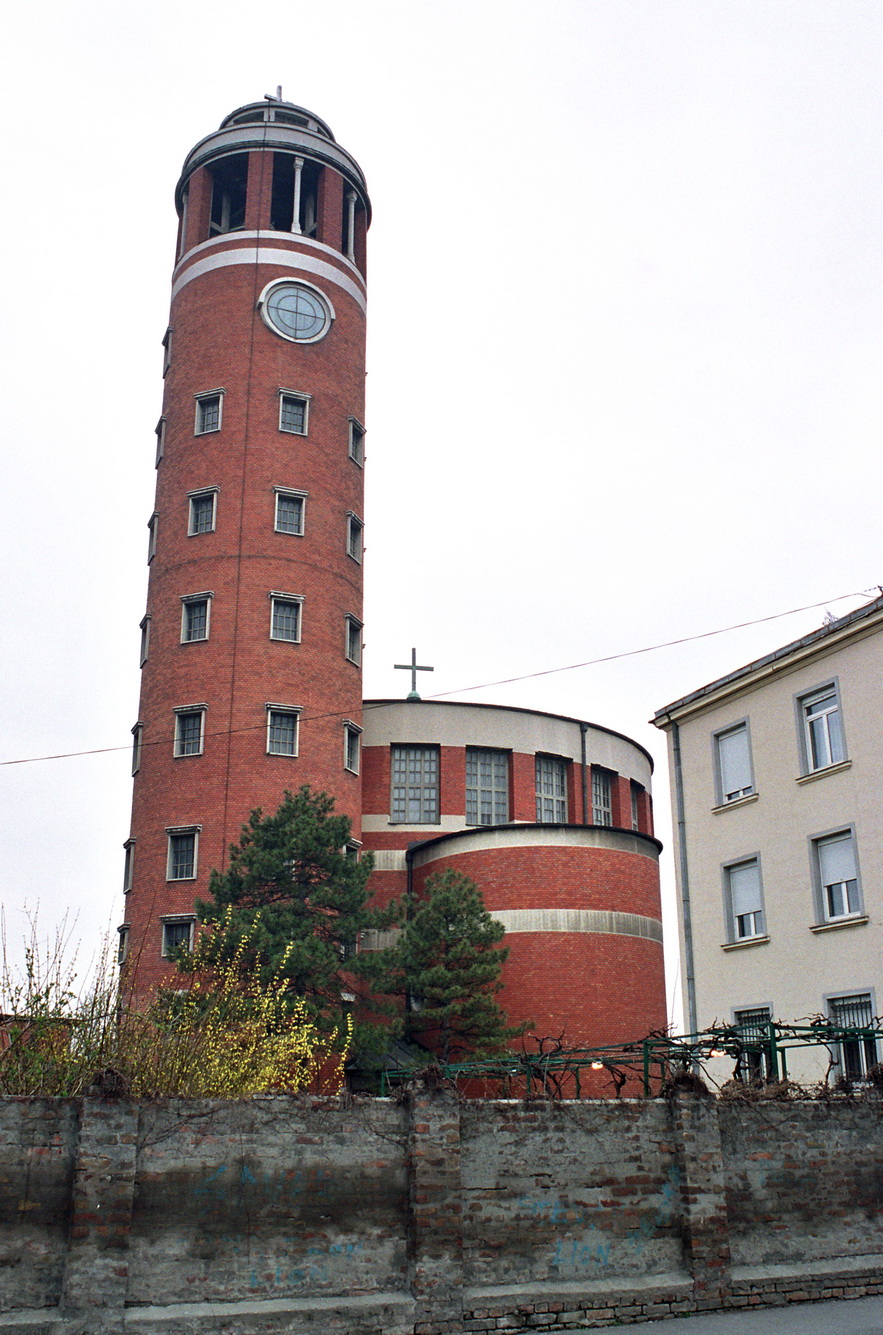
Church of St. Anthony of Padua in Belgrade

== See also ==
- Catholic Church in Serbia
- List of Catholic dioceses in Serbia

== Sources ==
- Andrić, Stanko (2016). "Saint John Capistran and Despot George Branković: An Impossible Compromise". Byzantinoslavica. 74 (1–2): 202–227.
- Eubel, Konrad (1923). Hierarchia Catholica Medii Aevi (1503–1592) (in Latin). Vol. 3. Monasterii Sumptibus et typis librariae.
- Mitrović, Katarina (2011). "The Peace of Passarowitz and the Re-establishment of the Catholic Diocesan Administration in Belgrade and Smederevo". The Peace of Passarowitz, 1718. West Lafayette: Purdue University Press. pp. 209–217.
- Točanac-Radović, Isidora (2018). "Belgrade - Seat of the Archbishopric and Metropolitanate (1718–1739)". Belgrade 1521-1867. Belgrade: The Institute of History. pp. 155–167. ISBN 978-86-7743-132-7.
