= Church of St. Anthony of Padua, Belgrade =

Church in Belgrade, Serbia

Church of St. Anthony of Padua in Belgrade
- Црква Светог Антуна Падованског; Crkva Svetog Antuna Padovanskog
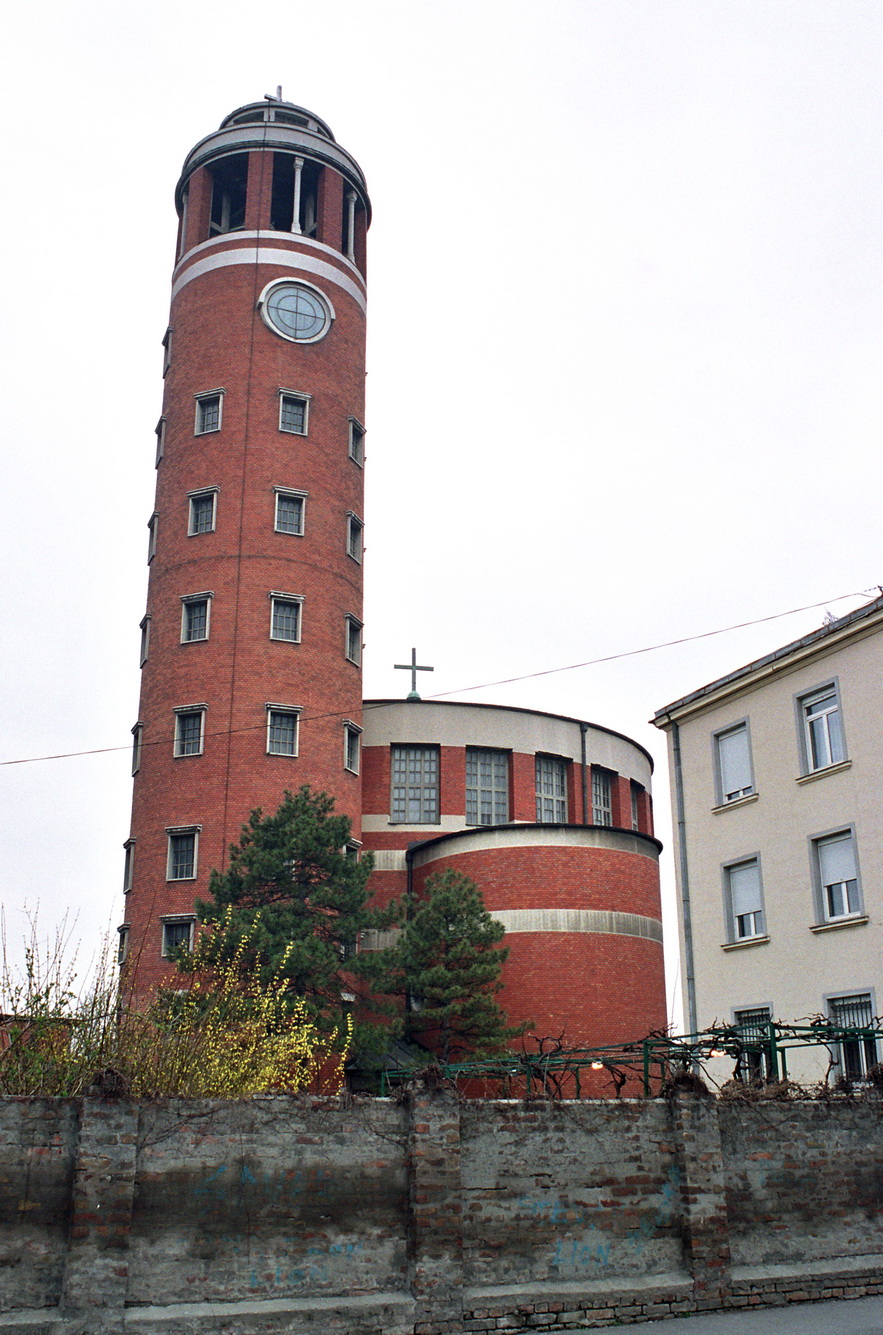
- Church of St. Anthony of Padua, pictured in 2005
- Church of St. Anthony of Padua in Belgrade
- 44.7968°N 20.4905°E
- Location: Belgrade
- Country: Serbia
- Denomination: Roman Catholic

History
- Dedication: Anthony of Padua

Architecture
- Architect: Jože Plečnik
- Groundbreaking: 1929
- Completed: 1931

Administration
- Archdiocese: Archdiocese of Belgrade

The Church of St. Anthony of Padua (Serbian: Црква Светог Антуна Падованског, romanized: Crkva Svetog Antuna Padovanskog) is a Roman Catholic church in Belgrade, Serbia. The church was dedicated to Anthony of Padua, and it was built between 1929 and 1932 in the memory of 700 years from his death.

== Architecture ==
The design of this Belgrade church was made by a prominent Slovenian and Central European architect of the late 19th and the first half of the 20th century Jože Plečnik (1872–1957), a student of the famous architect from Vienna Otto Wagner, later the professor of architecture at the university in Prague. The idea of hiring the architect Plečnik came from the Father Josip Markušić, and after the project made for the Franciscians in Slovenia. The entire concept of the building was totally entrusted to the architect.

This circular building (rotunda) is notable for its size, its central-plan form, and its brick lining. Its design draws on ancient Roman and early Christian and early Byzantine sacred architecture, particularly examples from Rome, Constantinople, Solun and Ravenna, such as the Pantheon in Rome, early Christian baptisteries, and the Little Hagia Sophia in Constantinople. it also draws on later medieval, Renaissance and Baroque central-plan churches.

The building has the basic form of rotunda, with an apse in the east, the porch in the west and cylindrical bell tower in the southeast side; it was not built according to the initial, but to the second, slightly altered project of the architect Plečnik. In the base form – along with the huge circular form with the leaning smaller circle – the symbolic reading and connection with iconographic representation of the temple's patron holding the infant Jesus Christ. The porch with a wooden eaves is supported by three pairs of thin columns, as well as pillars of a square cross section. The columns continue in the entrance hall (narthex), flanked by the smaller rectangular chapels. The main room is circular and cylindrical, 25 m in diameter and 17.5 m in height, with side conches, that is, the horseshoe shaped chapels in the thickness of the walls of rotunda, which are intended for special small altars and the confessional. Three conches are arranged on both north and south side, whereas opposite the entrance, in the apse, there is the main altar, that is, a deep presbytery, under which there is a crypt. The shape of rotunda is also emphasized by the specially positioned marble floor panels of different colours. Due to the large height of the church, three galleries were formed. Over the entrance there is a small gallery with the organ, the second horseshoe shaped gallery spreads all the way to the altar, whereas the upper gallery is patrol (deambulatorium), and it spreads along the entire circumference of the rotunda, thus enabling the largest penetration of natural light. Above the entrance there is a bigger oculus in the level of the first gallery. The niche in the level of the second gallery is reserved for still not realized St. Anthony's sculpture. The special attention was paid to the making of the details on the capitals of the porch and the entrance vestibule.

Until the World War II the interior of the church was equipped with the altars and church furniture, and it was gradually finished later, whereas the monumental bell tower with 52m in height and 9m in diameter was built in 1962 according to the slightly modified designs of the architect Plečnik, and according to the instructions of his student Janez Valentinčić. Along with the bell tower, he also made designs for the entrance porch, stone floor in the presbytery, benches, organ and chandeliers. Some of the Slovenian artists also took part in the designing: stonemasons, founders and carpenters, out of which the most distinguished was a sculptor Božo Pengov. The main altar of the St. Anthony is in the apse, with the bronze sculpture of the patron of the church holding the infant Jesus Christ, the work of Ivan Meštrović, set in 1935. The altar of the Heart of Jesus and the Lady's altar (Maria's Annunciation) were set in the north and south conches, observed from the main altar, and further on there are the altars of Saint Joseph and Francis of Assisi, as well as the unfinished altar of the Christ's suffering. In the churchyard, there is a two-storey building with neobaroque gable, in which there is a little sculpture of St. Anthony with the baby Christ. That building is intended to be a parsonage and a friary, where the head of the monastery guardian dwells.

Church of St. Anthony of Padua is the only, unique and original author's achievement of Slovenian architect Plečnik in Belgrade, it belongs to the group of his most important sacral achievements, and it stands out among his entire opus. It is one of the rare examples among the rest of the churches of this catholic order, of mostly basilica forms, due to the type of the central building. Due to its modernity it fits into the Belgrade architecture between the two world wars. The reinforced concrete walls are covered with the red bricks, both from the inside and from the outside, except for the concrete wreaths and stone frames, in the spirit of that time, and even ahead of the architecture of its time, since they anticipate the use of the materials in the contemporary architecture from the period between the seventh and the eighth decade of the 20th century. According to the idea, first of all the return to the archetype and the source of Christianity was presented, since the universal Christian concept was implemented with the interplay of the influences of the early Western Christian and Byzantine architecture. Along with the church services, the spiritual music concerts are also held in the church.

Church of St. Anthony of Padua was declared a cultural heritage site in 2010.

== Gallery ==
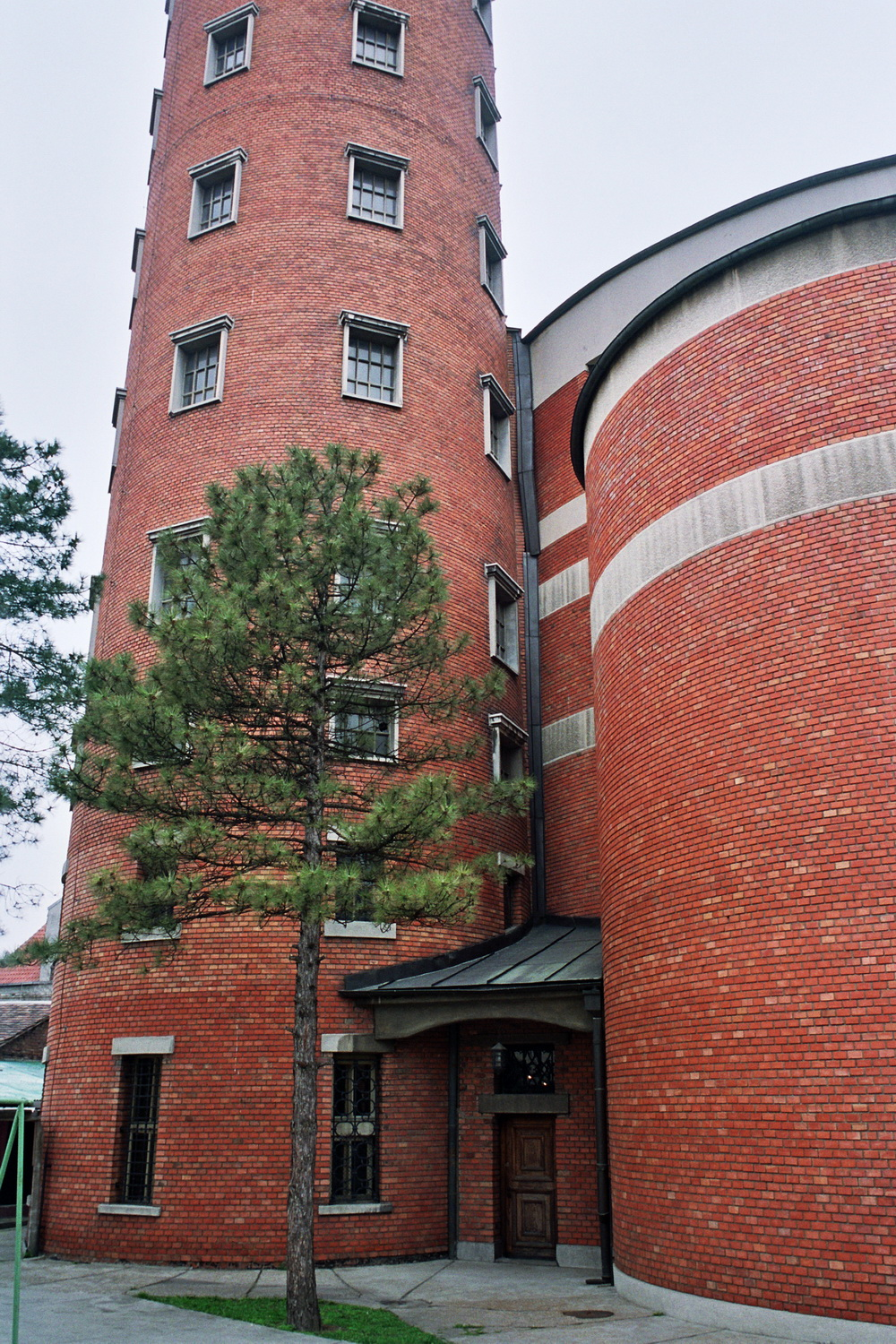

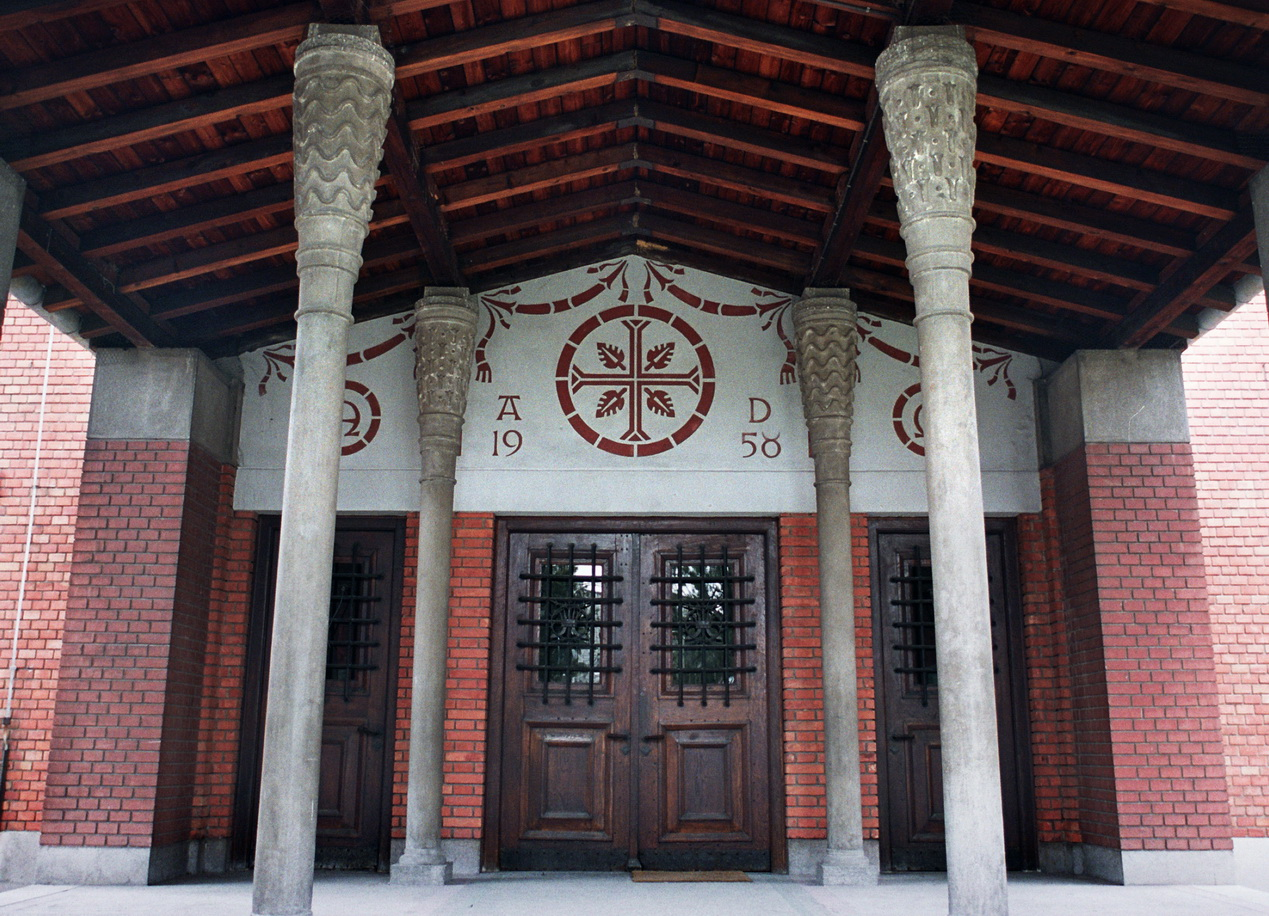

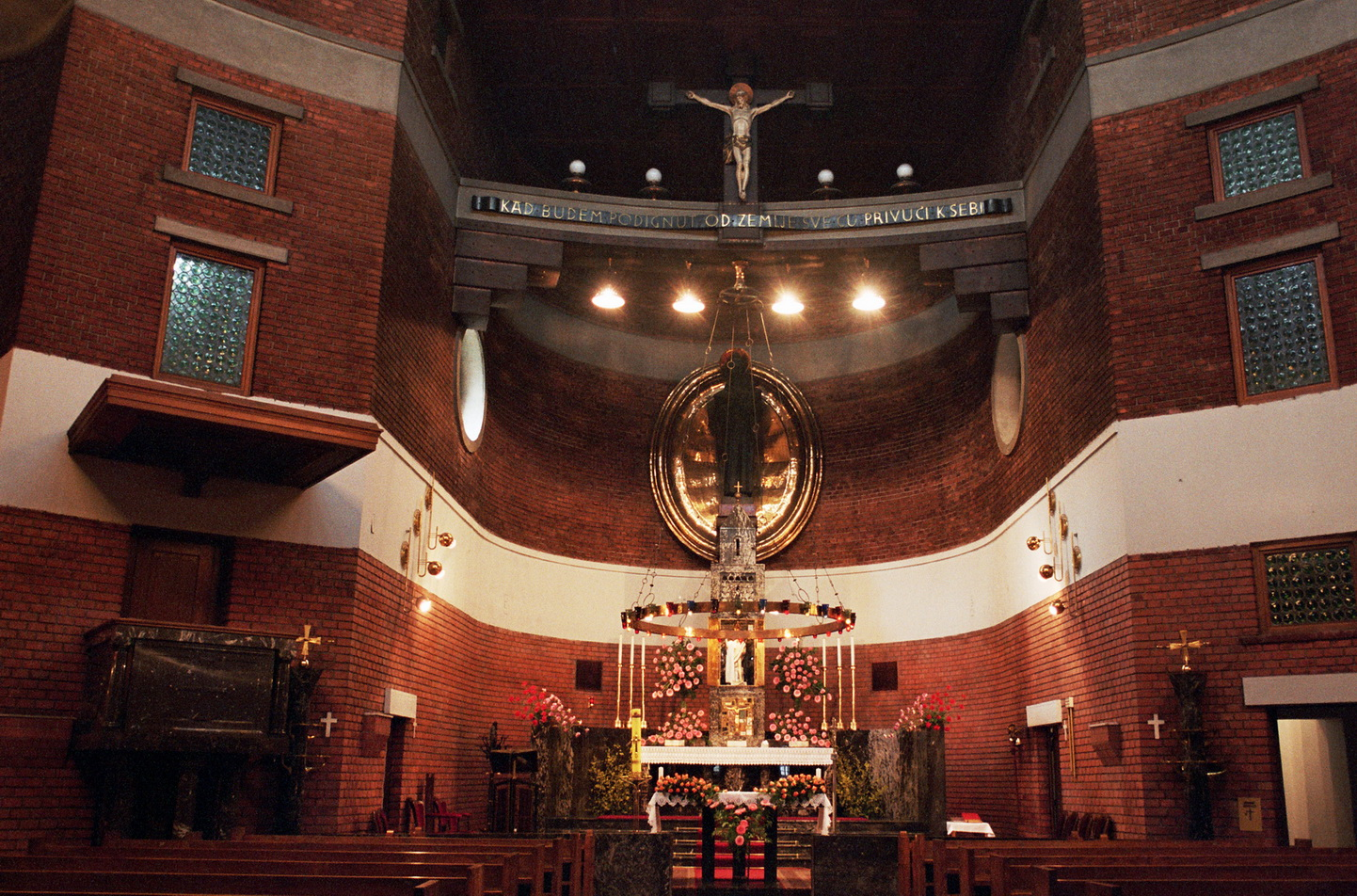

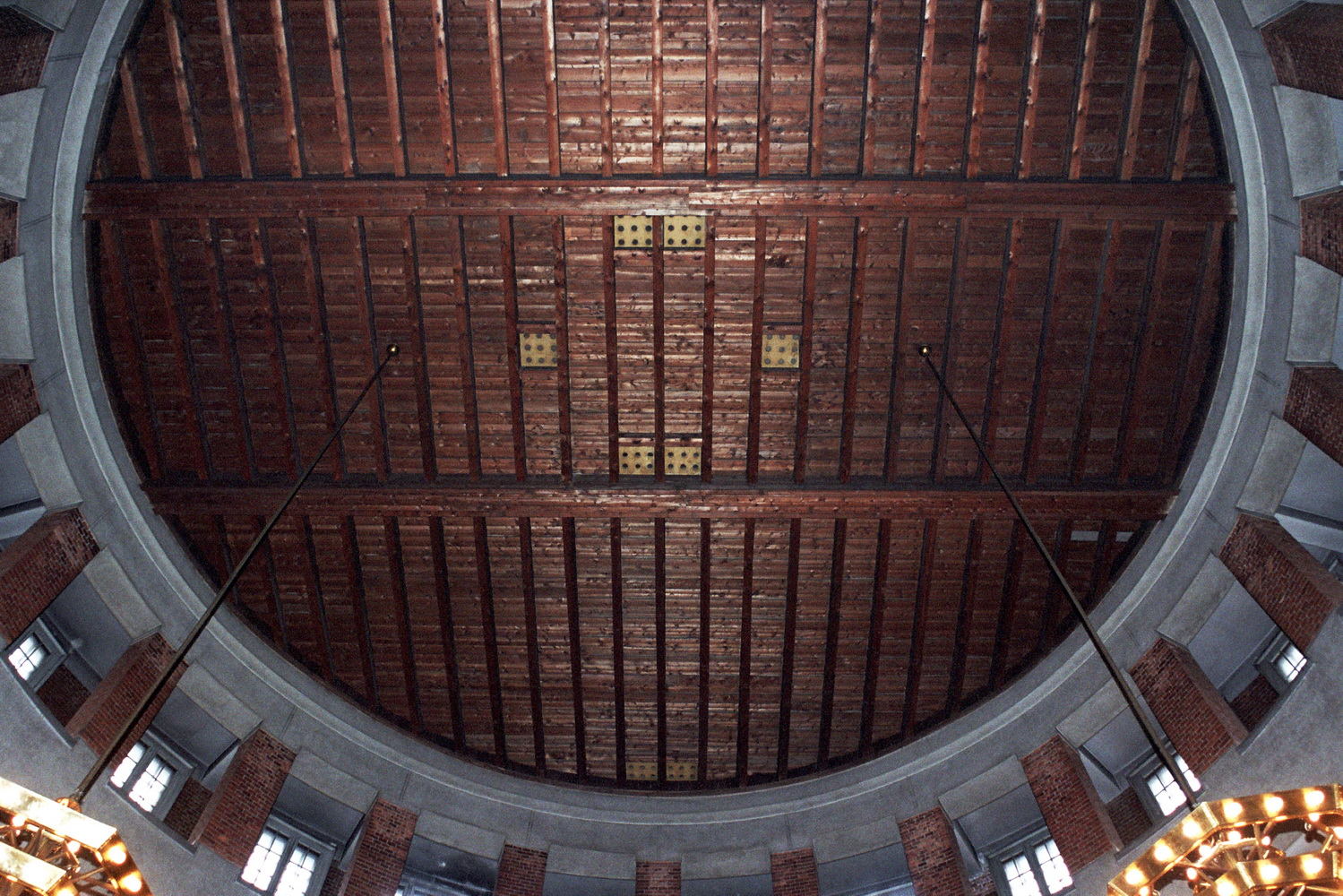

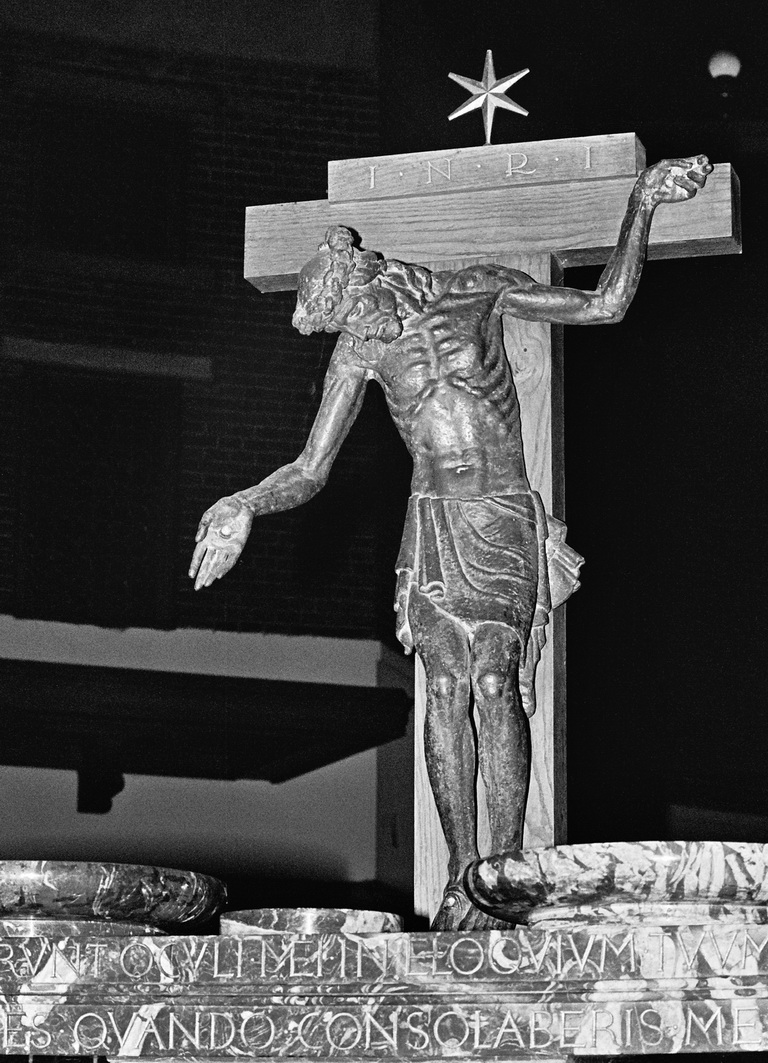

== See also ==
- Catholic Church in Serbia

== Literature ==
1. А., The first monumental temple in Belgrade, Serbian Literary Gazette, 36, 1932.
2. While the St. Sava temple has been built for decades, Franciscans will soon finish the St. Anthony Church, Vreme, 2. February 1932.
3. М. Мušič, Plečnik in Belgrade, ZLUMS, 9, 1973.
4. М. Мušič, Jože Plečnik, Partizanska knjiga, Ljubljana, 1986.
5. П. Krečič, Plečnik: The Complete Works, AD, London, 1993.
6. D. Prelovšek, Jože Plečnik 1872–1957, Architecture Perennis, Yale Un. Press, New Haven, 1997.
7. D. Prelovšek, Plečnik's sacral art, Ognjište, Koper, 1999.
8. Z. Маnević, Plečnik and Belgrade, Sveske DIUS, 14, Belgrade, 1983.
9. Т. Damljanović, Two temples for two confessions: the search for the modern-Byzantine, The Heritage, VI, Belgrade, 2005, 77–84.
10. P. Krečič, The Church of St. Anthony of Padua in Belgrade– the assessment of the heritage protection and the guidelines for the reconstruction, The Heritage, VI, Belgrade, 2005.
11. Architectural Heritage: Моdern, but Byzantine, Politika, 22 June 2005.
12. К. Glišić, Roman Catholic churches on the territory of Belgrade, master's thesis, Faculty of Philosophy of the Belgrade University, 2007.
