= Cathedral of the Blessed Virgin Mary, Belgrade =

Cathedral in Belgrade, Serbia

Coordinates: 44.7944°N 20.4760°E

Cathedral of the Blessed Virgin Mary
- Катедрала Блажене Девице Марије
- Katedrala Blažene Device Marije
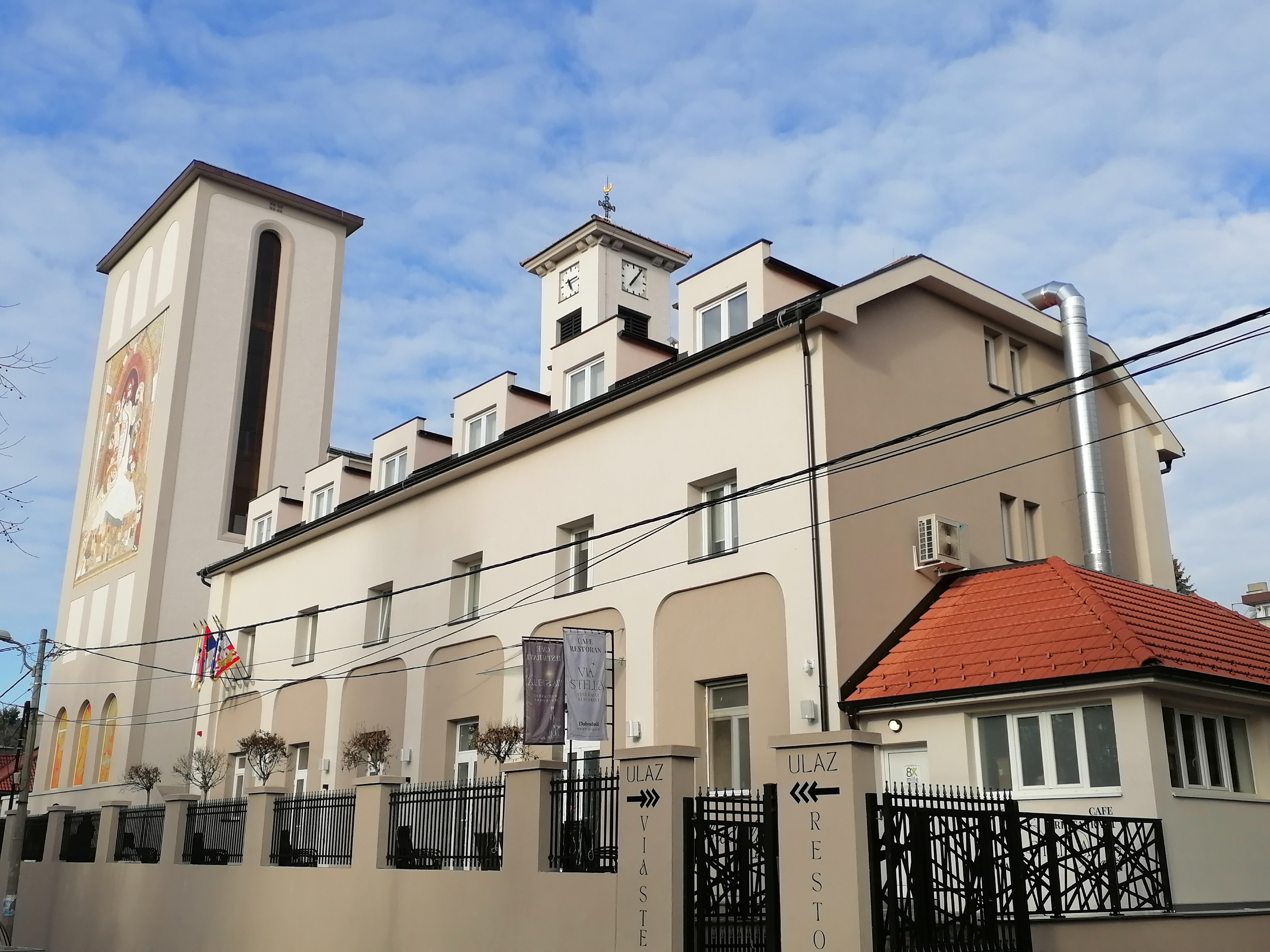
- Cathedral of the Blessed Virgin Mary, pictured in 2022
- Cathedral of the Blessed Virgin Mary
- Location: Hadži Melentijeva 35, Belgrade
- Country: Serbia
- Denomination: Roman Catholic Church

History
- Consecrated: 1925 (old church); 1988 (new church)

Architecture
- Years built: 1924-1925 (old church); 1938-1988 (new church)

Administration
- Archdiocese: Archdiocese of Belgrade

The Cathedral of the Blessed Virgin Mary (Serbian: Катедрала Блажене Девице Марије, romanized: Katedrala Blažene Device Marije), also known as the Belgrade Catholic Cathedral, is the Roman Catholic church in Belgrade, Serbia. It is under jurisdiction of the Archdiocese of Belgrade and serves as its cathedral church.

Along with the neighboring objects (old church from 1925, auxiliary edifices, etc.) cathedral is part of the monastery complex known as the Marijanum, after the Virgin Mary (Marija in Serbian).

== History ==
A group of French business people settled in the area in the early 1920s. Their children were taught by the Assumptionist nuns and the monks, who came in 1924, built the church in 1924-1925, which was colloquially called the "French church" by the local population. The church was consecrated on 25 September 1925 by Angelo Roncalli, at the time Holy See's apostolic visitor to Bulgaria, and the future pope John XXIII. The school, called the French-Serbian School of Saint Joseph, was officially opened in 1926. Originally within the church, the school was relocated to the Rankeova Street in 1928, where the facilities of the modern Belgrade University Stomatology Faculty are today. In 1930, the monumental belfry was erected, consisting of three bells: the largest was donation of the king Alexander I of Yugoslavia, middle one was sent from the Vatican and the smallest one was purchased from the donation of the adherents.

In 1938 the Assumptionists began building a new church, envisioned as the memorial church for the French and Serbian soldiers killed in the World War I, with the addition of the clergy house and the monastery. Marble plates with inscriptions in French and Serbian languages mark the occasion and purpose of the building. The church was designed by architect Branislav Marinković. Due to the outbreak of World War II, the new church remained unfinished with only the walls of the building and first levels of belfry being finished. The occupying German forces used it as the ammunition storage. After the war new Communist authorities basically commandeered it. It was used as the storage unit for the factories and medicinal products but, due to the good acoustics, it was used by the Radio Belgrade for taping the music shows and for filming movies. For a while, it also served as the drug rehabilitation center.

Facing the diminished interest among the younger generations to serve in the church, the Assumptionists left in 1982. At this time, the state officially returned the church back to the Roman Catholic Church. Catholics took over the church and after almost 50 years continued the construction of the church in 1987. The new church was consecrated and declared a cathedral of the Roman Catholic Archdiocese of Belgrade in 1988. The monastery and the adjoining auxiliary edifices were transformed into the Home of the Saint John of Capistrano. New monumental pipe organ was installed in 2000.

As it was actually never fully completed, a massive reconstruction, including the completion of the complex, is planned. Plans also include the opening of the Museum of the Catholic Church.

== Architecture ==
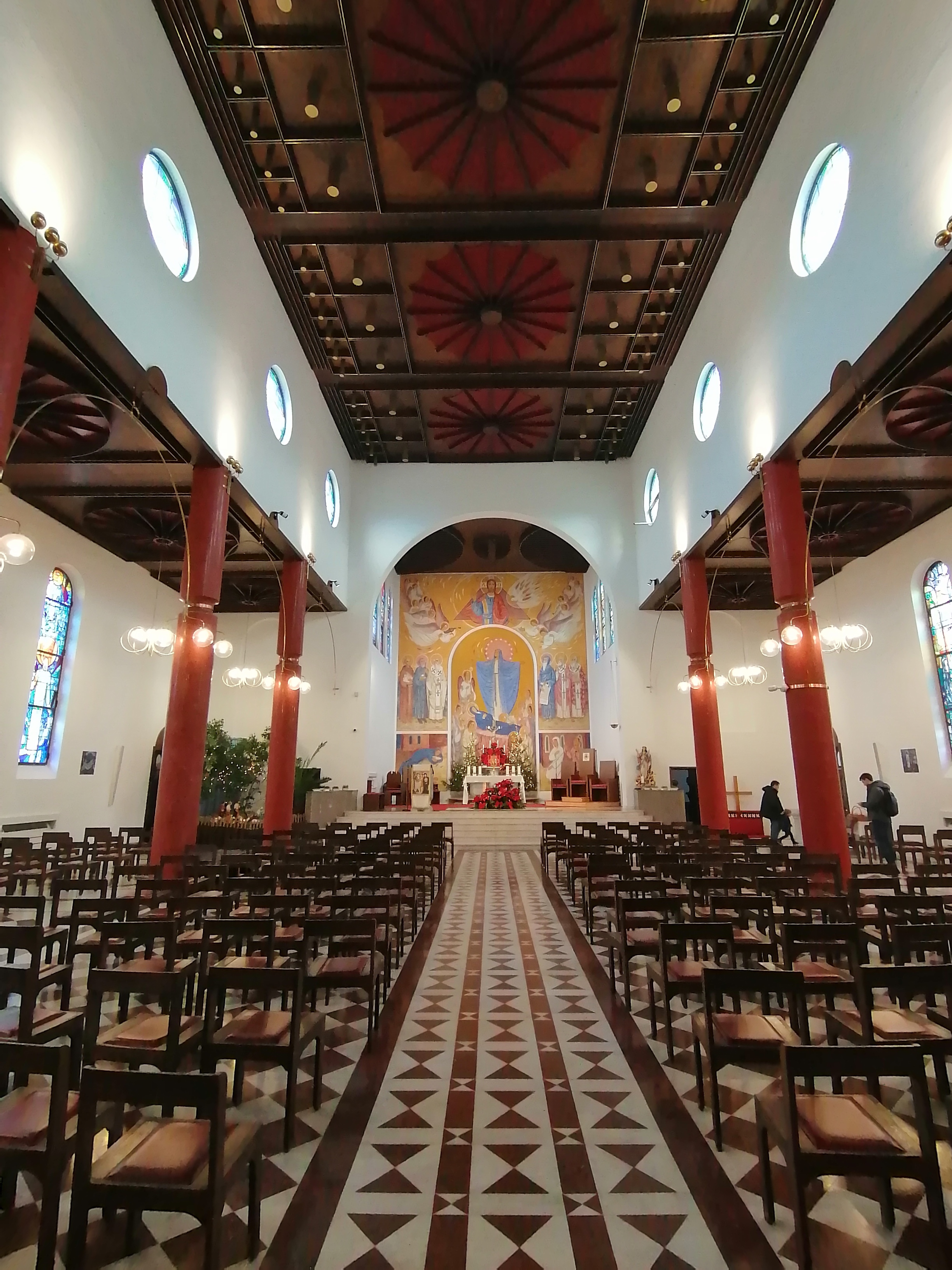
Interior

The interior of the new church was painted in the mixed Catholic-Orthodox manner, sometimes described as the result of the "picturesque illustration of the confusing encounter of the East and West in Belgrade". Virgin Mary was presented in both traditions, in the Orthodox one in the lower section and in the Western Marian iconography in the upper section. She is surrounded by both the Catholic and Orthodox saints, including the father of the Serbian church, Saint Sava. Other represented saints include Saints Cyril and Methodius, Saint John Capistrano, Saint Cyril of Alexandria and Saint Nicholas of Flue. Remaining from the French Assumptionists, there is a Gallic rooster on the cross above the old belfry. Saint John of Capistrano, whose name bears the monastery, was chosen because of his participation in the successful defense of the city during the 1456 Siege of Belgrade. He personally commanded the detachment consisting of the Crusaders and strongly pushed for the all-European Crusade against the Ottoman Turks.

Suggestions for the mix of the Serbian Orthodox motifs in the Catholic church came from Franc Perko, the archbishop of Belgrade from 1986 to 2001, who wished to show that Belgrade is the meeting point of the West and the East. The church remains the only Catholic cathedral with the image of Saint Sava at the altar.

== See also ==
- Catholic Church in Serbia
- List of cathedrals in Serbia
