= Eparchy of Kruševac =

Diocese of the Serbian Orthodox Church

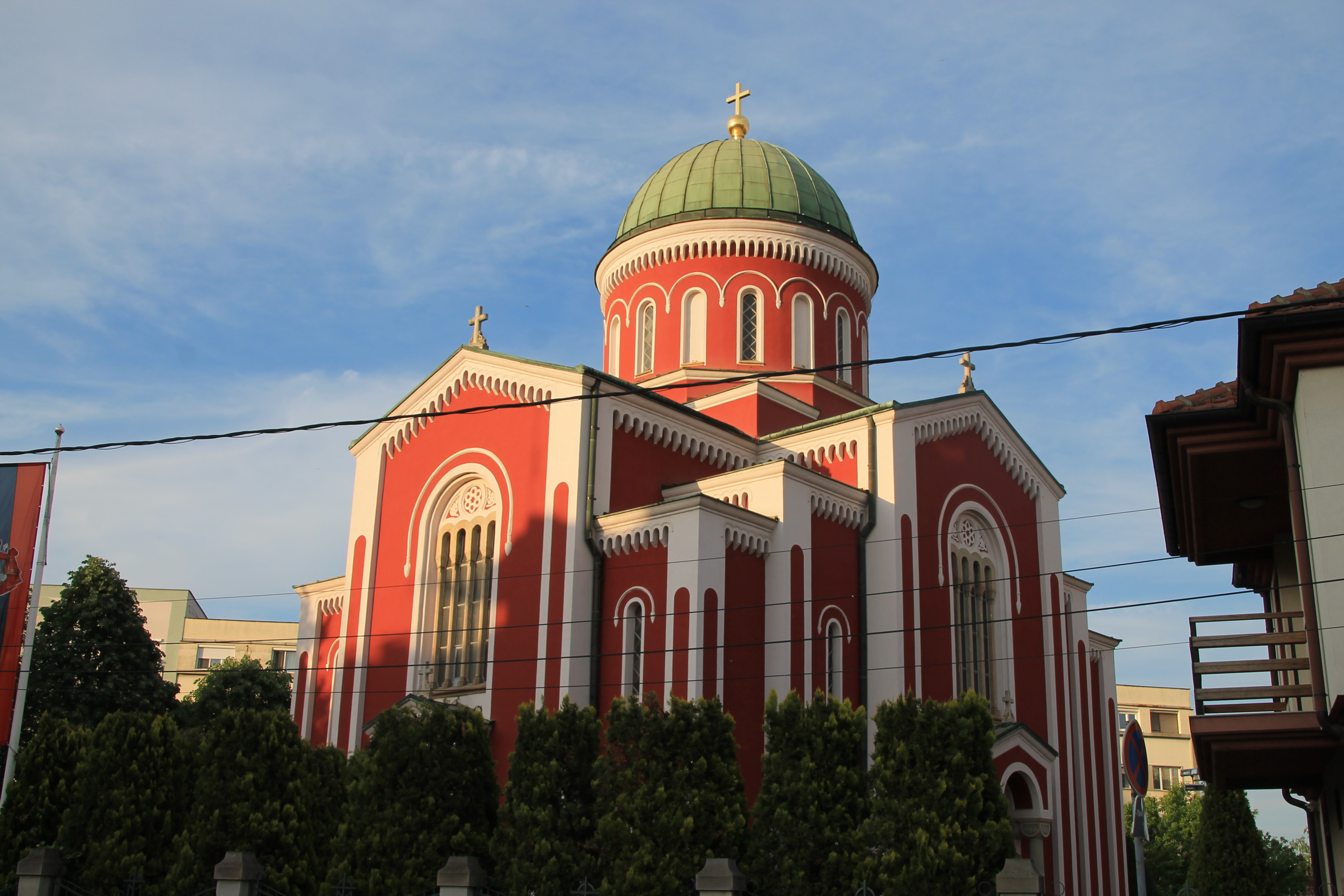
- Saint George Cathedral, Kruševac

Location
- Territory: Rasina District
- Headquarters: Kruševac, Serbia

Information
- Denomination: Eastern Orthodox
- Sui iuris church: Serbian Orthodox Church
- Established: 2010
- Cathedral: Saint George Cathedral, Kruševac
- Language: Church Slavonic, Serbian

Current leadership
- Bishop: David Perović

Map

Website
- Eparchy of Kruševac

The Eparchy of Kruševac is (Serbian: Епархија крушевачка, romanized: Eparhija kruševačka) is a diocese (eparchy) of the Serbian Orthodox Church, covering Rasina District in central Serbia.

The episcopal see is located at the Saint George Cathedral, Kruševac. Its headquarters and bishop's residence are also in Kruševac.

== List of bishops ==
- David Perović (2014–present)

== Notable monasteries ==
- Ljubostinja
- Naupara

== Gallery ==
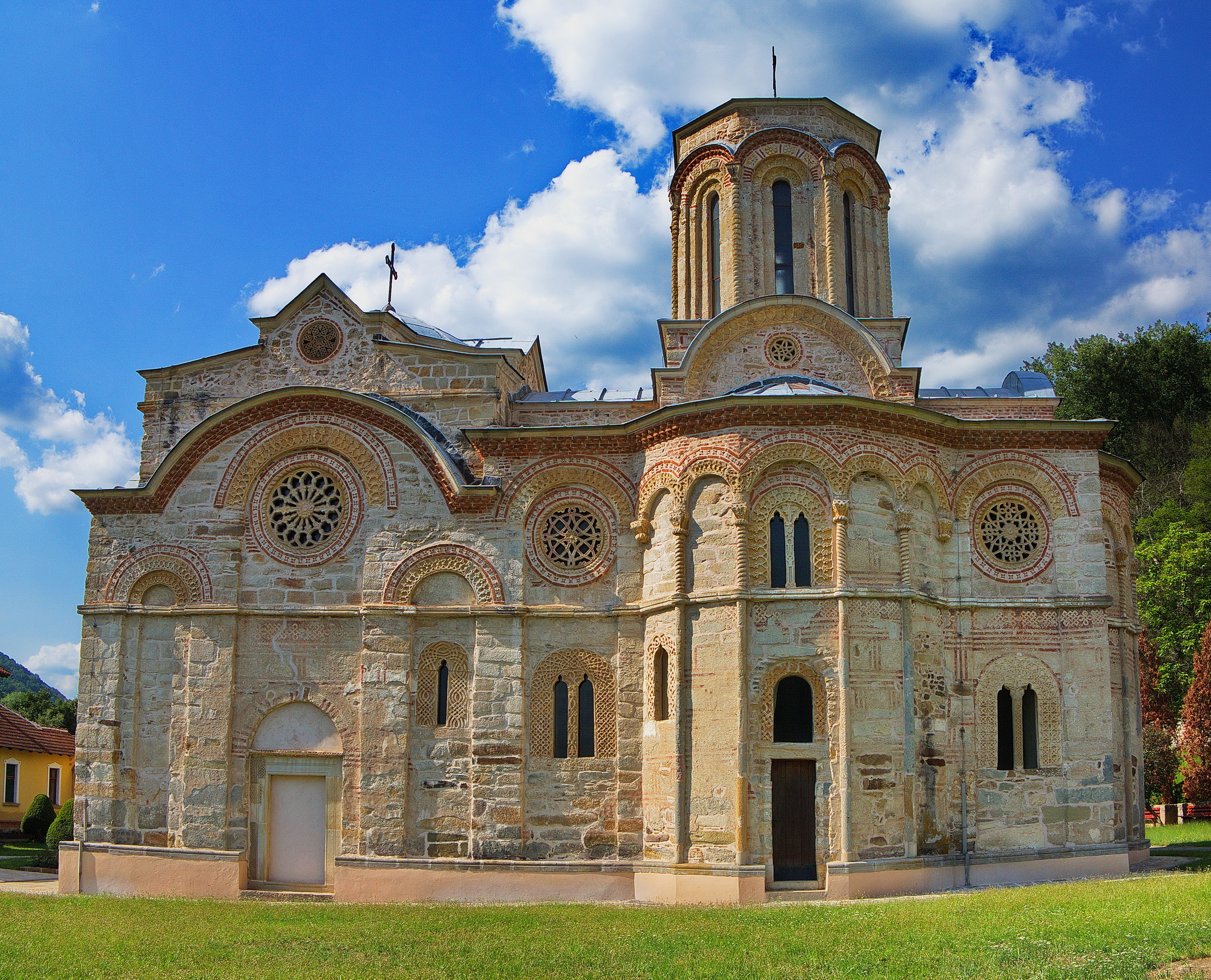
Ljubostinja Monastery

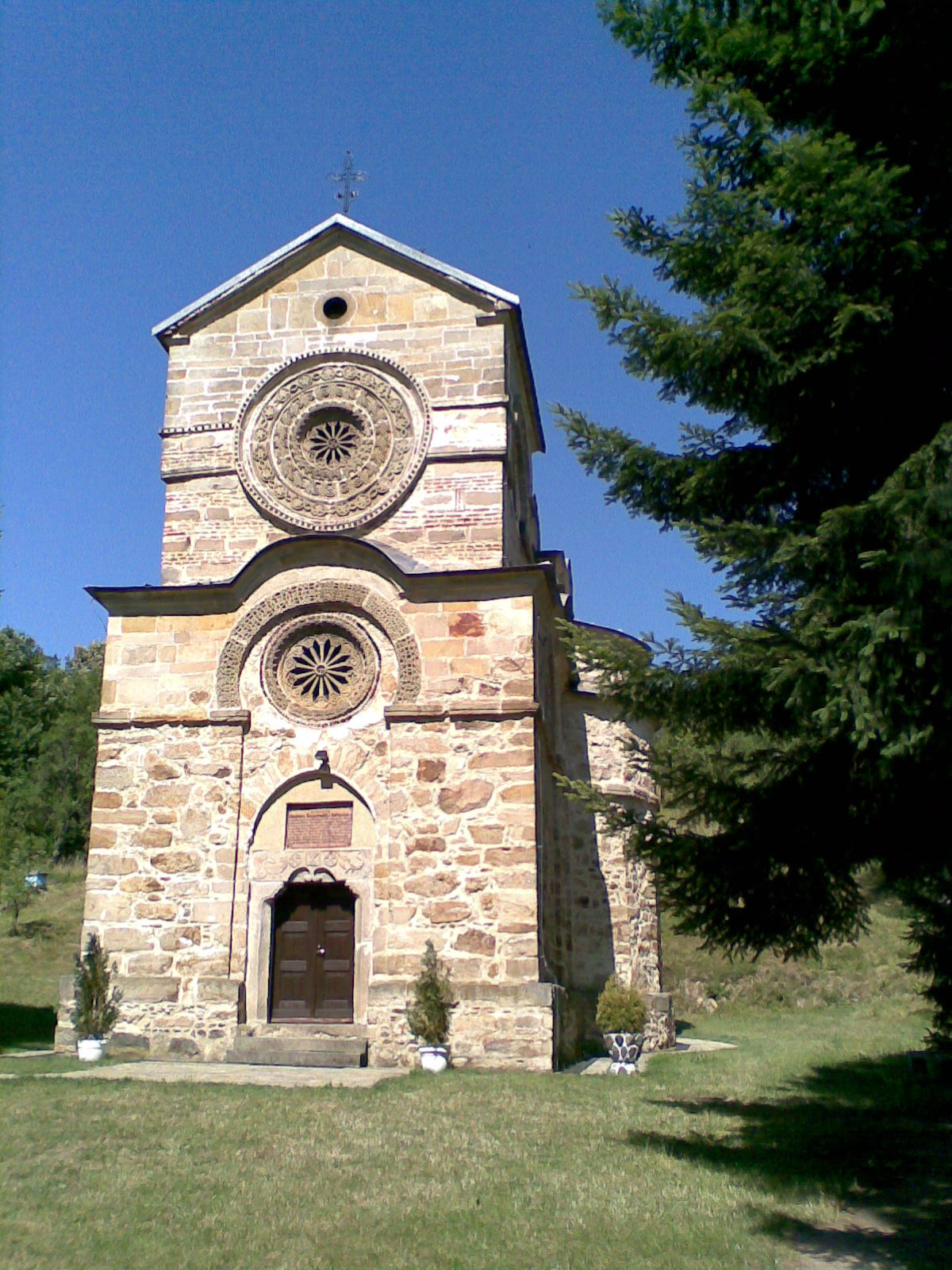
Naupara Monastery

== See also ==
- Eparchies and metropolitanates of the Serbian Orthodox Church
