= Religion in Vojvodina =

This is an article about religion in Vojvodina, a province of Serbia.

== Demographics ==
Christianity is the predominant religion in Vojvodina, with Eastern Orthodoxy being by far the largest denomination. Among the remaining religions, Islam has the largest number of adherents, although no religion other than Christianity accounts for more than 1% of the population. According to data from the 2022 census, the religious structure of the population is as follows:

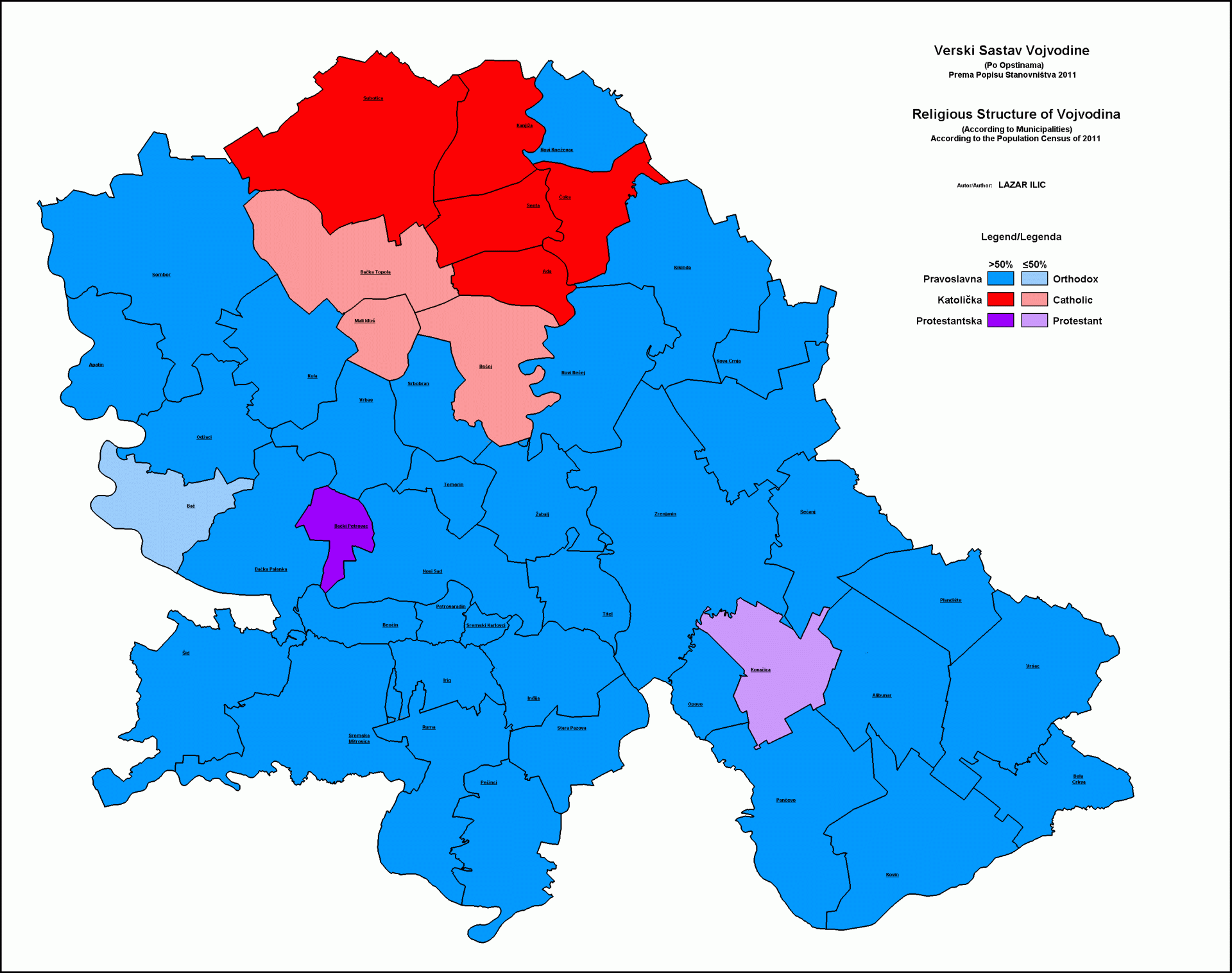
Religious map of Vojvodina

Religion	Adherents	Share
Christianity	1,528,515	87.8%
Eastern Orthodoxy	1,228,236	70.6%
Catholicism	243,587	14%
Protestantism	47,568	2.7%
Other Christian	9,124	0.5%
Islam	15,049	0.8%
Judaism	196	0.01%
Other religions^{*}	567	0.03%
Atheism	25,192	1.4%
Agnosticism	2,458	0.1%
Undeclared	84,288	4.8%
Unknown	83,965	4.8%
^{*} mainly Eastern religions (Chinese folk religion, Buddhism, and Hinduism)

== Christianity ==
=== Eastern Orthodoxy ===
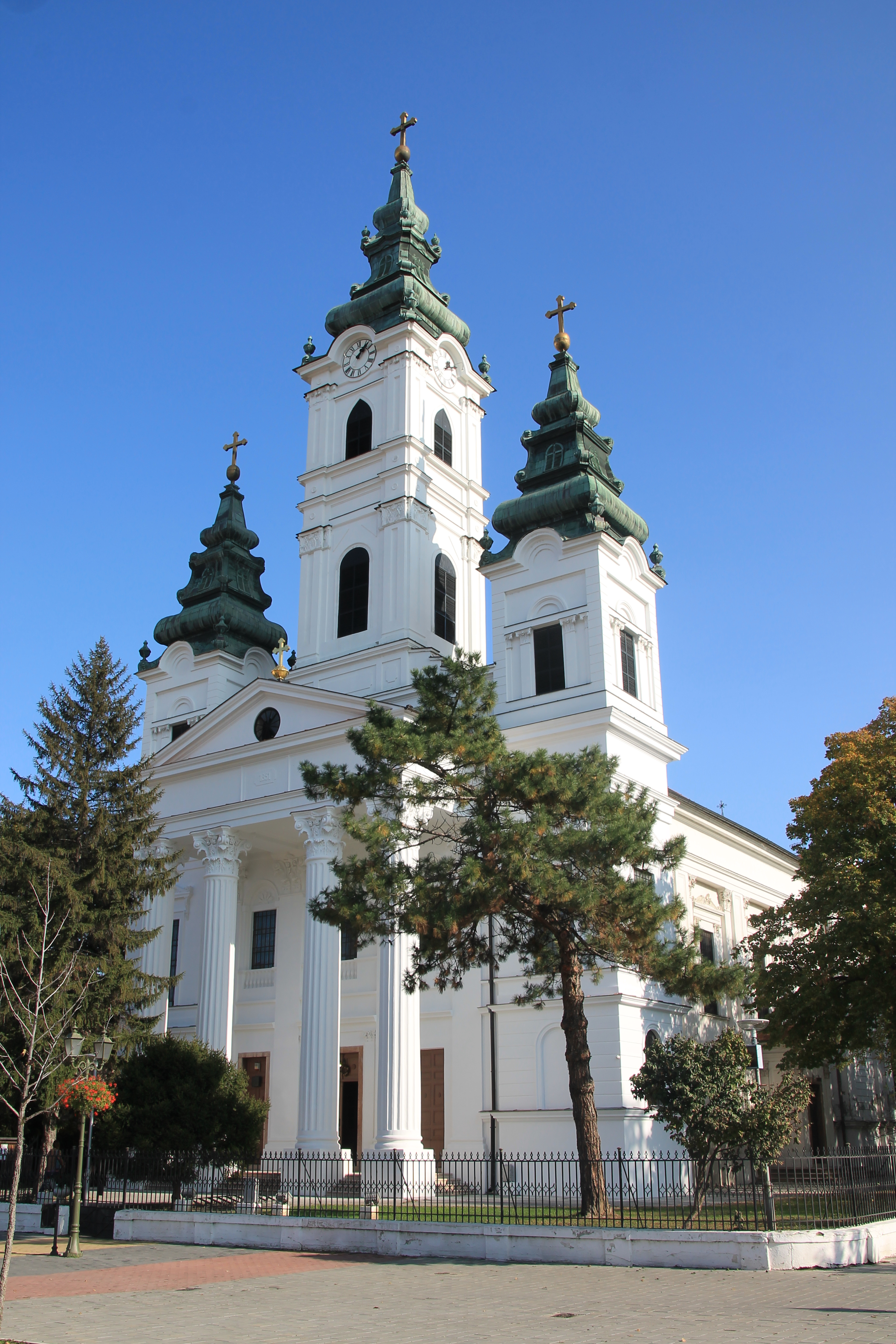
Orthodox Church of Saint George in Bečej

Eastern Orthodoxy is the most widely professed Christian denomination in the province. The Serbian Orthodox Church, the traditional church and sole canonical Orthodox jurisdiction in Serbia, encompasses the vast majority of Orthodox Christians in the province, including ethnic Serbs, Montenegrins, Macedonians, and Roma. Based on a mutual agreement between the Serbian Orthodox Church and the Romanian Orthodox Church, the Romanian Orthodox Church, through its Diocese of Dacia Felix, is granted the right to exercise jurisdiction over ethnic Romanians in Banat, just as the Serbian Orthodox Church, through its Eparchy of Timișoara, exercises jurisdiction over ethnic Serbs in the Romanian part of Banat.

Vojvodina has played a significant role in the history of Eastern Orthodoxy among Serbs. Following the Great Migrations of the Serbs into the Habsburg monarchy, the region became the seat of the Metropolitanate of Karlovci, which served as the leading Serbian ecclesiastical institution in the 18th and 19th century. In 1848, it was elevated to the Patriarchate of Karlovci, which remained an important center of Serbian religious and cultural life until its incorporation into the re-unified Serbian Orthodox Church in 1920.

Among the most important Serbian Orthodox religious sites are the monasteries of Fruška Gora, such as Krušedol, Staro Hopovo, Šišatovac, Vrdnik-Ravanica, among others. Fruška Gora is often referred to as the "Serbian Holy Mountain" due to historical and spiritual significance of the monasteries there.

=== Catholicism ===
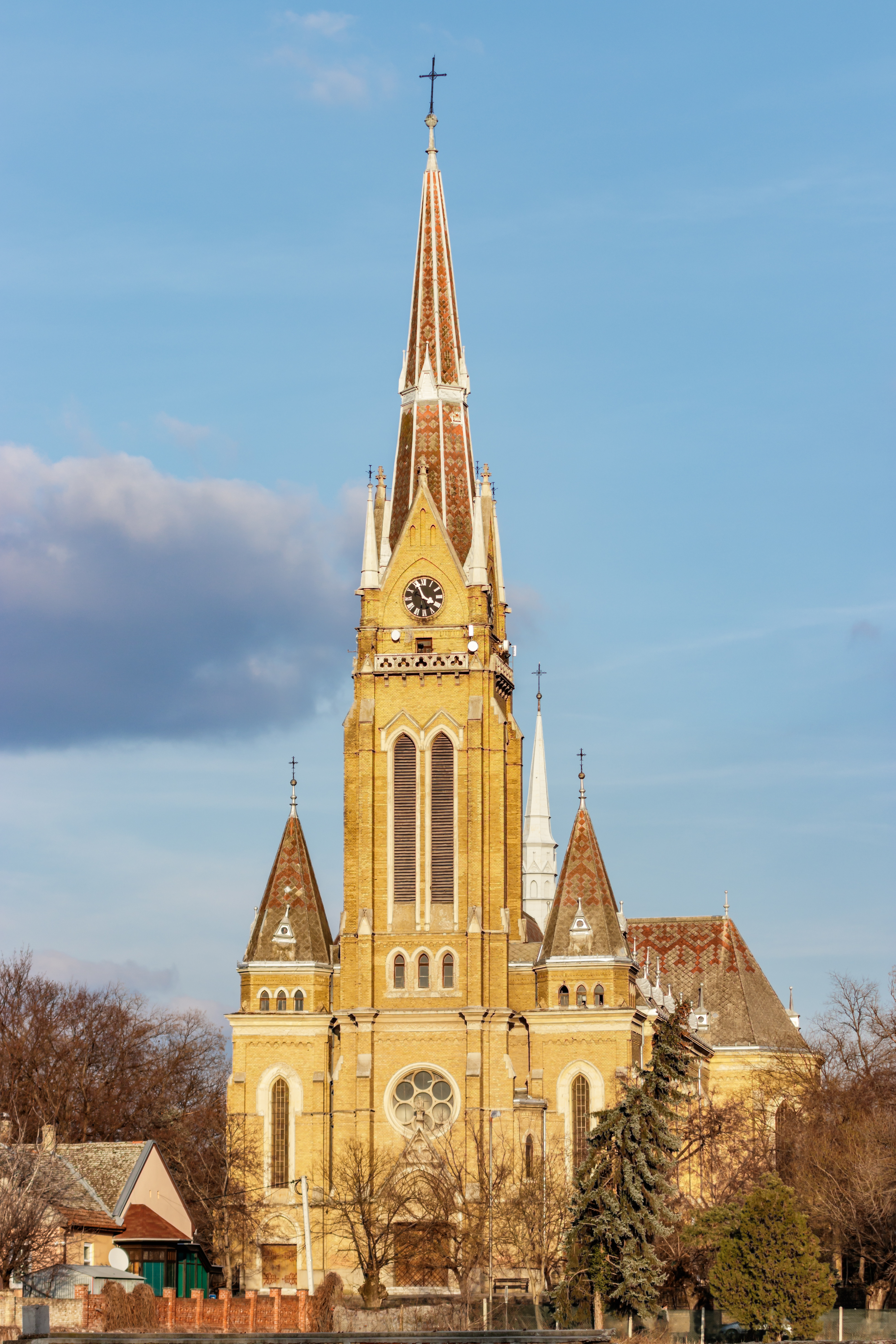
Catholic Church of the Visitation of the Blessed Virgin Mary in Bačka Topola

Catholics in Vojvodina have historically been overwhelmingly Roman Catholic, with only a small minority being Greek Catholic. The Catholic Church has a strong following among ethnic Hungarians, Croats, and Bunjevci, as well as among Rusyns, who are predominantly Greek Catholic. Catholics are mostly concentrated in the northern part of the region, notably in municipalities with a Hungarian ethnic majority and in the multiethnic cities of Subotica and Bečej. In Subotica, the fifth-largest city in the country, Catholics constitute the largest religious group.

=== Protestantism ===
Protestantism in Serbia has a strong following among ethnic Slovaks, who are predominantly Lutheran and constitute the majority of the Protestant population. It is also present among Hungarians, who are predominantly Reformed (Calvinist), although a small minority of ethnic Hungarians adhere to Protestantism. The highest proportions at the municipal level are found in the municipalities of Bački Petrovac and Kovačica, where ethnic Slovaks constitute either an absolute or a relative majority of the population. A sizeable Protestant population is also found in Novi Sad, the provincial capital.

== Islam ==
Islam has had a significant historical presence in Vojvodina during the Ottoman rule over the region in the 16th and 17th centuries. Following the establishment of the Habsburg rule at the end of the 17th and the beginning of the 18th century, the Muslim population fled from the region. Islam has its largest following among the region's Roma population (although most Roma are affiliated with Eastern Orthodoxy) as well as amnog ethnic Muslims, Albanians, and Gorani.

== Judaism ==
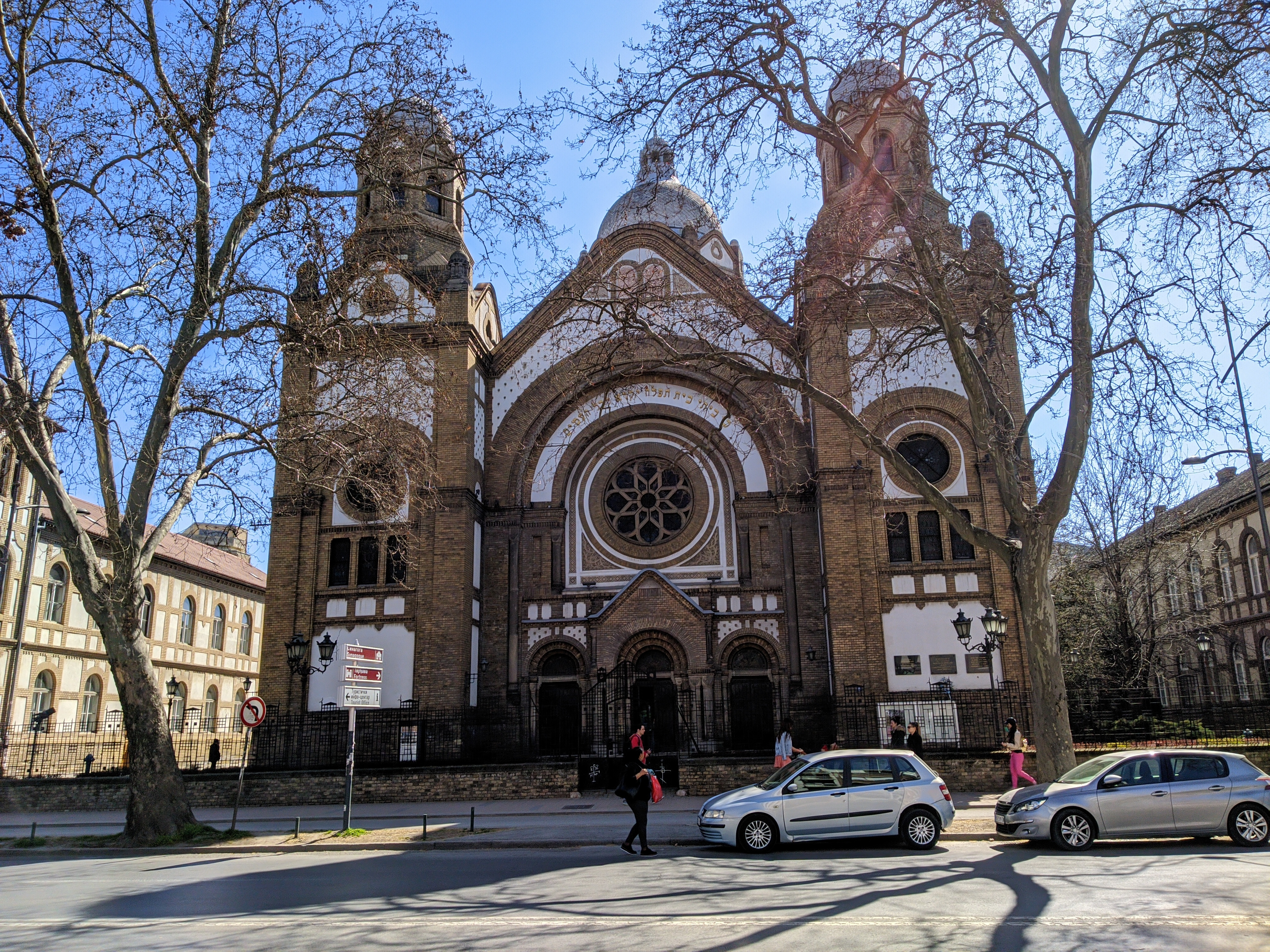
Novi Sad Synagogue

As elsewhere in the world, Judaism is primarily associated with ethnic Jews. The Jewish community flourished during the Interwar period, reaching a peak of 33,000 people in Serbia, nearly 90% of whom lived in the territory of present-day Vojvodina. About two-thirds of Serbian Jews were murdered in the Holocaust. After the war, most of the remaining Jewish population emigrated, mainly to Israel. As a testament to their historical presence in the region, there are two large synagogues: the Novi Sad Synagogue and the Subotica Synagogue, the latter being the second-largest synagogue building in Europe after the Dohány Street Synagogue in Budapest.

== See also ==
- Religion in Serbia
