= Christianity in Serbia =

Most widely professed religion in Serbia

Christianity is the most widely professed religion in Serbia which has been a predominantly Christian country since the christianization of Serbs in the 9th century. According to the 2022 census, Christians numbered 5,758,719 in Serbia, comprising 86.7% of the population, of whom the vast majority were adherents of Eastern Orthodoxy.

== History ==
During the Diocletianic Persecution in 304, Sirmium became a place of martyrdom for Saint Irenaeus, Anastasia, and Fausta. Not much before 313 while emperor Licinius was present in Singidunum, he oversaw trial and murder of deacon Hermylus and Stratonicus whose bodies were thrown in the Danube but resurfaced downriver and were later buried by Christians and venerated as saints. Successor of Irenaeus as bishop of Sirmium was Domnus who attended the First Council of Nicaea. By the mid 4th century, Christian communities on territory of modern-day Serbia were numerous and influential. Sirmium, Singidunum, Naissus, Viminacium, Remesiana, Horreum Margi, Margum are all mentioned as bishoprics by 343. Bishops Germinius of Sirmium and Ursacius of Singidunum were influential in then ongoing Arian controversy. Four ecclesiastical Councils of Sirmium were important events for whole Christendom. Bishop Nicetas of Remesiana during his long tenure (366–420) contributed much to the spread of Christianity in the region and earliest mention of monastic communities dates from his time.

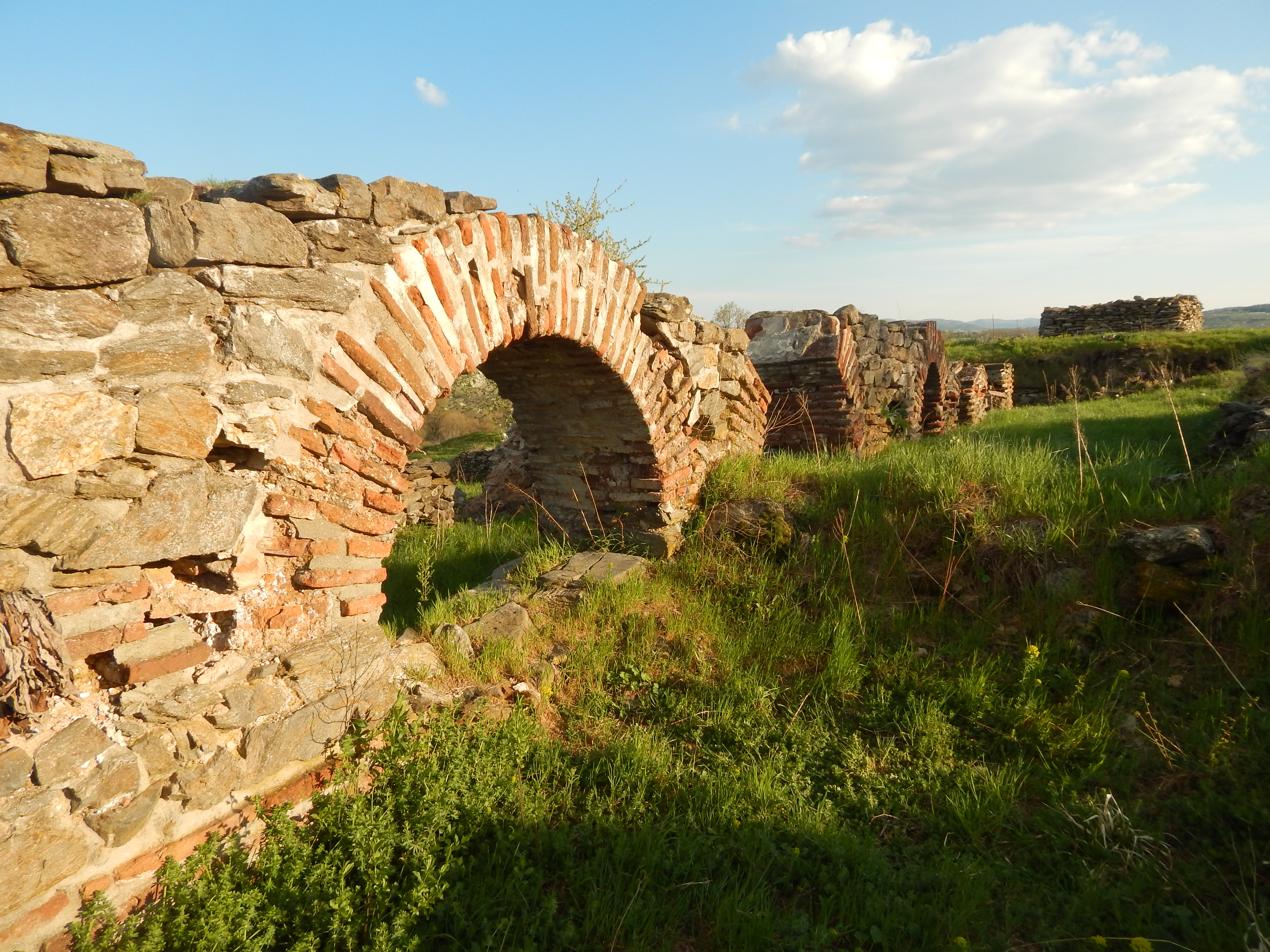
Ruins of the Justiniana Prima, seat of the Archbishopric of Justiniana Prima

Bishopric of Sirmium lost much influence once Huns raided the city in 441/442. In 535 a new Archbishopric of Justiniana Prima was established and was given jurisdiction over most of aforementioned bishoprics. Many new churches and basilicas were built during the reign of emperor Justinian I. However mere decades later entire established ecclesiastic structure collapsed under the impact of Avar raids and Slavic settlement that followed. The last known archbishop of Justiniana Prima and indeed of any bishopric on territory of modern-day Serbia for centuries to come was Ioannes (c. 595-602/3). In 733, Leo III attached Illyricum to Patriarch Anastasius of Constantinople.

The establishment of Christianity as state religion dates to the time of Eastern Orthodox missionaries Cyril and Methodius during reign of Basil I (r. 867–886), who baptised the Serbs sometime before sending imperial admiral Niketas Ooryphas to Prince Mutimir for aid in the war against the Saracens in 869, after acknowledging the suzerainty of the Byzantine Empire. The fleets and land forces of Zachlumia, Travunia and Konavli were sent to fight the Saracens who attacked the town of Ragusa (Dubrovnik) in 869, on the immediate request of Basil I, who was asked by the Ragusians for help. A Serbian bishopric of Ras may have been founded in Stari Ras in 871 by Serbian Prince Mutimir, confirmed by the Council of Constantinople in 879–80. The adherence is evident in the tradition of theophoric names in the next generation of Serbian princes and nobles; Petar Gojniković, Stefan Mutimirović, Pavle Branović. Mutimir maintained the communion with the Eastern Church (Constantinople) when Pope John VIII invited him to recognize the jurisdiction of the bishopric of Sirmium. The Serbs and Bulgarians adopted the Old Slavonic liturgy instead of the Greek. A Seal of Strojimir (died between 880 and 896), the brother of Mutimir, was bought by the Serbian state in an auction in Germany. The seal has a Patriarchal cross in the center and Greek inscriptions that say: "Strojimir" (CTPOHMIP) and "God, Help Serbia".

Notable early church building is Church of the Holy Apostles Peter and Paul near modern-day city of Novi Pazar, built at the beginning of the 9th century.

In 1019, the Archbishopric of Ohrid was established after the Byzantines conquered the First Bulgarian Empire and the Greek language replaced the Slavic in liturgy. Serbia was ecclesiastically administered into several dioceses; the Diocese of Ras, mentioned in 1019, became part of the Archbishopric of Ohrid and encompassed the southwest of the modern-day Serbia. Among the first bishops were Leontius (fl. 1123–1126), Cyril (fl. 1141–1143), Euthemius (fl. 1170), and Kalinik (fl. 1196). It was attached to the autocephalous Serbian Archbishopric (precursor of the Serbian Orthodox Church) in 1219, founded by Saint Sava.

== Denominations ==
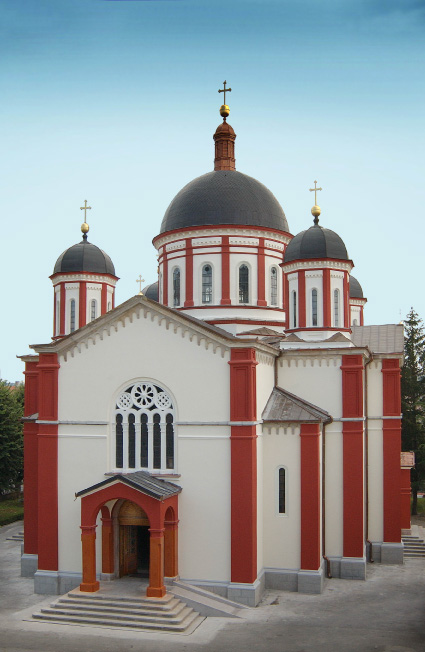
Orthodox Cathedral of the Dormition of the Theotokos in Kragujevac

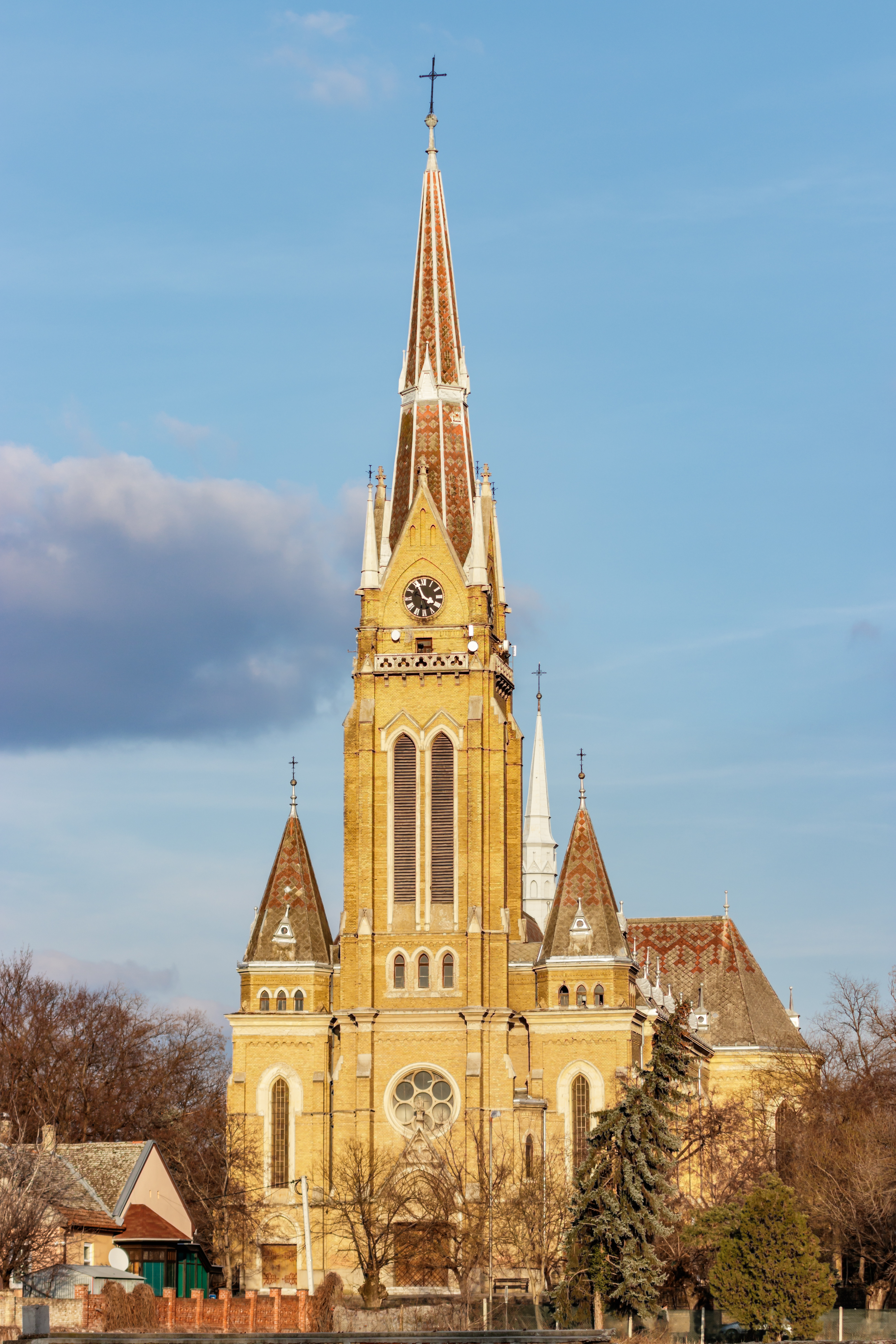
Catholic Church of the Visitation of the Blessed Virgin Mary in Bačka Topola

=== Eastern Orthodoxy ===
The Eastern Orthodoxy is by far the largest Christian denomination in Serbia. The Serbian Orthodox Church is the traditional church of the country and the sole Eastern Orthodox canonical jurisdiction in the territory of Serbia, member of the Eastern Orthodox communion. Eastern Orthodoxy has a strong following among ethnic Serbs, country's titular and majority ethnic group, as well as among ethnic minorities such as Vlachs, Romanians, Montenegrins, Macedonians, and Bulgarians.

=== Catholicism ===
Catholic Church is minor Christian denomination in Serbia. Catholics in Serbia have historically been overwhelmingly Roman Catholic, with only a tiny fraction being Greek Catholic. Catholic Church in Serbia has a strong following among ethnic Hungarians, Croats, and Bunjevci, as well as among Rusyns, who are predominantly Greek Catholic.

=== Protestantism ===
Protestantism is a very minor Christian denomination in Serbia. Protestants have historically been made up of Magisterial Protestants (Lutherans and Calvinists) and Radicals (Anabaptists/Nazarenes), although in recent decades Evangelical Protestants (Pentecostals and Baptists) and Adventists have expanded their presence. Protestantism has a strong following among ethnic Slovaks.

=== Restorationism ===
There are two main Restorationist movements in the country: Jehovah's Witnesses and Mormons. Jehovah's Witnesses are active in Serbia since 1930. Mormons through its Church of Jesus Christ of Latter-day Saints are active in the country since 1992 and known for their missionary activities.

== See also ==
- Religion in Serbia

== Sources ==
- Fotić, Aleksandar (2008). "Serbian Orthodox Church". Encyclopedia of the Ottoman Empire. New York: Infobase Publishing. pp. 519–520. ISBN 9781438110257.
- Radić, Radmila (2007). "Serbian Christianity". The Blackwell Companion to Eastern Christianity. Malden, MA: Blackwell Publishing. pp. 231–248. ISBN 9780470766392.
- Sotirović, Vladislav B. (2011). "The Serbian Patriarchate of Peć in the Ottoman Empire: The First Phase (1557–94)". Serbian Studies: Journal of the North American Society for Serbian Studies. 25 (2): 143–169. doi:10.1353/ser.2011.0038. S2CID 143629322.
- Живковић, Тибор (2004). Црквена организација у српским земљама: Рани средњи век (Organization of the Church in Serbian Lands: Early Middle Ages). Београд: Историјски институт САНУ, Службени гласник. ISBN 9788677430443.
- Živković, Tibor (2007). "The Golden Seal of Stroimir" (PDF). Historical Review. 55. Belgrade: The Institute for History: 23–29. Archived from the original (PDF) on 2018-03-24.
- Živković, Tibor (2012). De conversione Croatorum et Serborum: A Lost Source. Belgrade: The Institute of History.
- Živković, Tibor (2013). "On the Baptism of the Serbs and Croats in the Time of Basil I (867–886)" (PDF). Studia Slavica et Balcanica Petropolitana (1): 33–53.
