= Freedom of religion in Serbia =

Freedom of religion in Serbia refers to the extent to which people in Serbia are freely able to practice their religious beliefs, taking into account both government policies and societal attitudes toward religious groups.

The laws of Serbia establish the freedom of religion, forbid the establishment of a state religion, and outlaw religious discrimination. In 2023, the country was scored 4 out of 4 for religious freedom.

== Demographics ==
According to data from the 2022 census, about 87% of Serbia's population was Christian, with Eastern Orthodoxy, at 81%, being by far the largest denomination, followed by the Catholic Church at almost 4%, while both Protestantism and "other Christian" affiliations accounted for less than 1% each. Islam was the only significant non-Christian religion, with Muslims comprising more than 4% of the total population. Other religions included Judaism and Eastern religions. The remaining share was divided among atheists, agnostics, and individuals without a declared religious affiliation.

== History ==
Prior to the Serbian Revolution in the early 19th century which culminated in the establishment of the autonomous Serbian state which remained a vassal to the Ottoman Empire, Serbia had been occupied by the Ottoman Empire for 300 years. Under Ottoman rule, Christians were forced to pay religious taxes and were treated as second-class citizens. Following esytablishment of the Principality of Serbia, autonomous Metropolitanate of Belgrade was established in 1831. Prince Miloš Obrenović, the head of state, supported policies that promoted secularism in order to curb the Church's power over his authority.

Following the Herzegovina uprising of 1875, Serbia declared war on the Ottoman Empire, seeking its full independence in what would become known as the Serbian-Ottoman Wars. During the conflict, Serbian forces expelled between 30,000 and 70,000 Muslims, mostly Albanians, from Serbia. Despite losing the first Serbian-Ottoman War, the Serbians won their independence in the ensuing war (also known as the Russo-Turkish War of 1877). Serbia became a kingdom in 1882.

Following World War I, Serbia was merged with other majority Slavic territories in the Balkans to form the Kingdom of Serbs, Croats, and Slovenes. The largest religious denomination was Eastern Orthodoxy (approximately 50% of the population), followed by Catholicism (approximately 40%), with the greater part of the remainder professing Islam. Muslims faced prejudice from the other religious groups, but were granted some concessions from the government, such as the establishment of enclaves which were governed by Sharia. A small Jewish population was also present in the kingdom, and were generally treated well by the rest of the population and the government.

A constitution was passed in 1921, which led to an increase of tensions between ethno-religious blocs. Prime Minister Nikola Pašić used the police to suppress opposition groups and ethnic minorities, particularly the Catholic Croats, who were the primary opposition against his goal of a highly centralized, Serb-dominated state. In 1928, a Serb representative in parliament opened fire against the opposition bench, killing Stjepan Radić of the Croatian Peasant Party. King Alexander I used this as a pretext to ban national political parties, abolish the constitution and convert the country to a personal dictatorship, as well as renaming it the Kingdom of Yugoslavia and reorganizing the country's internal administration. Alexander I attempted to reduce ethnoreligious separatism by promoting a unified Yugoslav nationalism, a political strategy which ultimately both alienated the Serbs and failed to mollify the Croats.

The 1930s saw the rise of the Ustaše, a Croat fascist organization which advocated the establishment of an independent Croatian state through violent means, and which embarked on a terrorist campaign of bombings, assassinations, and sabotage. In 1931, Alexander I adopted a new constitution, which enshrined the freedom of religion, but also established a unitary state, which was perceived by non-Serbs as a cover for Serbian dominion over the state. Representatives of the various minority groups issued declarations demanding the establishment of a new constitution. The government responded to both the Ustaše insurgency and the political pronouncements with often violent police action, which only further bolstered support for separatist groups. In 1934, Alexander I was assassinated by a Bulgarian-Macedonian nationalist who had contacts with the Ustaše.

Following Alexander I's death, Yugoslavia entered a regency led by Prince Paul of Yugoslavia. Paul attempted to pursue a policy of democracy and decentralization in the hopes of mollifying Serb and Croat nationalists. In 1941, Yugoslavia joined the Axis powers, a decision which was met with massive opposition by the Serb population, as well as Liberals and communists of all nationalities. A military coup forced Paul to resign and placed 17-year-old Peter II on the throne. This would soon prompt a German invasion.

Following German invasion, Yugoslavia was divided between the Axis powers, as well as a newly created Croatian puppet state led by the Ustaše. The anti-Axis resistance movement was split into two major groups: royalist Chetniks and communist Partisans. As the country descended into what was effectively a civil war, there was an immense amount of ethno-religiously motivated violence. The majority of the Jewish population of Yugoslavia was killed by Axis-aligned forces, with only 17% surviving the war. Ustashe and German troops massacred Orthodox Serb civilians, while Chetnik militias targeted (Catholic) Croats and Muslims.

Following the end of World War II, Serbia was reconstituted as part of the Socialist Federal Republic of Yugoslavia, which established a nominally secular state, and did not engage in anti-religious campaigns to the extent of other countries in the Eastern Bloc.

In the late 1980s, Slobodan Milošević became one of the most powerful politicians in the country. Despite having a previous reputation as a hard-line communist anti-nationalist, Milošević pivoted toward Serbian nationalism. This in turn further motivated calls for independence from non-Serb ethnic groups, culminating in overwhelmingly successful independence referendums in Croatia and Slovenia in 1991 and 1990, respectively.

Yugoslavia broke apart in a series of wars over the course of the 1990s. Serbia provided significant material support to the Yugoslav People's Army and Serb paramilitary forces, which in turn committed numerous war crimes, many of which were motivated by enmities along ethnic and religious lines, primarily targeting Albanians, Croats, and Bosniaks.

== Legal framework ==
The Constitution of Serbia guarantees the freedom of belief and religion as well as the right to change one's religion. It states everyone shall have the freedom to worship and practice religion individually or with others, in private or in public, and no one shall be obliged to declare one's religion. The constitution states the freedom to express one's religion or beliefs may be restricted by law only as necessary to protect the lives and health of the people, the morals of democratic society, freedoms and rights guaranteed by the constitution, or public safety and order or prevent incitement of religious, national, or racial hatred.

The constitution forbids the establishment of a state religion, guarantees equality for religious groups, and calls for separation of religion and state. It states churches and religious communities shall be free to organize their internal structure, perform religious rites in public, establish and manage religious schools and social and charity institutions in accordance with the law.

The constitution recognizes the right of conscientious objection based on religious beliefs. It states no person shall be obliged to perform military or any other service involving the use of weapons if this is inconsistent with his or her religion or beliefs, but that a conscientious objector may be called upon to fulfill military duty not involving carrying weapons.

The constitution prohibits religious discrimination or incitement of religious hatred, calls upon the government to promote religious diversity and tolerance, and states that religious refugees have a right to asylum, the procedures for which shall be established in law. The law bans incitement of discrimination, hatred, or violence against an individual or group on religious grounds and carries penalties ranging from one to 10 years in prison, depending on the type of offense.

=== Recognized religious groups ===
The legal provisions of the Law on Churches and Religious Communities stipulate a two-tiered system of registered groups, split between "traditional churches and religious communities" and "non-traditional religious communities".

The law grants special treatment to seven religious communities defined as "traditional" by the state. These are the Serbian Orthodox Church, Roman Catholic Church, Slovak Evangelical Church of the Augsburg Confession, Reformed Christian Church, Evangelical Christian Church, the Islamic Community, and the Jewish community. "Church" is a term reserved for Christian religious groups, while the term "religious community" refers to non-Christian groups and to some Christian entities. The Islamic community is divided between the Islamic Community of Serbia (emphasis added), with its seat in Belgrade, and the Islamic Community in Serbia, with its seat in Novi Pazar. Although the law generally prohibits the registration of multiple groups with the same name, both Islamic communities are officially registered. The law grants the seven traditional religious groups the right to receive value-added tax refunds, to have their faith taught in public schools, and to provide chaplain services to military personnel.

There are 20 "nontraditional" religious groups registered with the state: the Seventh-day Adventist Church, Evangelical Methodist Church, The Church of Jesus Christ of Latter-day Saints, Union of Baptist Churches in Serbia, Union of Christian Baptist Churches in Serbia, Jehovah's Witnesses, Nazarene Christian Religious Community , Evangelical Church in Serbia, Church of Christ's Love, Spiritual Church of Christ, Church of God in Serbia, Protestant Christian Community in Serbia, Church of Christ Brethren in Serbia, Free Belgrade Church, Zion Sacrament Church, Union of Seventh-day Adventist Reform Movement, Protestant Evangelical Church Spiritual Center, Evangelical Church of Christ, the Slovak Union of Baptist Churches, and Charismatic Community of Faith in Serbia. Several of these organizations are umbrella groups that oversee many individual churches, sometimes of slightly differing affiliations.

==== Registration ====
The law does not require religious groups to register, but it treats unregistered religious organizations as informal groups that do not receive any of the legal benefits registered religious groups receive. For example, only registered religious groups may build new places of worship, own property, apply for property restitution, or receive state funding for their activities. Registration is also required for opening bank accounts and hiring staff. The law authorizes the government to provide social and health insurance and fund retirement plans only for religious clerics of registered groups. The law also grants property tax exemptions to all registered groups. Registered religious groups are exempt from paying administrative taxes and filing annual financial reports.

To obtain registration a group is required to submit the following: the names, identity numbers, copies of notarized identity documents, and signatures of at least 100 citizen members of the group; the group’s statutes and a summary of its religious teachings, ceremonies, religious goals, and basic activities; and information on sources of funding. The law prohibits registration if an applicant group’s name includes part of the name of an existing registered group. The Ministry of Justice maintains the Register of Churches and Religious Communities and responds to registration applications.

==== Criticism ====
Minority religious groups and non-governmental observers continued to state the law was inherently biased in differentiating between so-called traditional and non-traditional religious groups. They also stated the laws governing churches and religious communities were in conflict with constitutional guarantees of freedom of religion and equal status among religious groups. For example, in addition to the benefits traditional religious groups received according to law, the government provided those groups with financial support for religious events and publication or printing of religious materials. Minority groups also cited an inequitable distribution of government scholarships, at all educational levels, among religious groups. They stated the Directorate for Cooperation with Churches and Religious Communities, which provided support to religious groups, had the additional mandate of protecting the Serb ethnic identity and cooperating with Serbian Orthodox Church eparchies in neighbouring caountries as well as in Serb diaspora. In addition, the Roman Catholic Church, a traditional church, complained about what it said was preferential treatment of the Serbian Orthodox Church.

=== Restrictions and oversight ===
According to the constitution, the Constitutional Court may ban a religious community for activities infringing on the right to life or health, the rights of the child, the right to personal and family integrity, public safety, and order, or if it incites religious, national, or racial intolerance. It also states the Constitutional Court may ban an association that incites religious hatred.

The Ministry of Justice's Directorate for Cooperation with Churches and Religious Communities manages all expert and administrative matters pertaining to the cooperation of the state with churches and religious communities. These include assistance to ethnic minorities in protecting the religious traditions integral to their cultural and ethnic identity; cooperation between the state and Serbian Orthodox dioceses abroad; support for religious education; and support for and protection of the legal standing of churches and religious communities. The Ministry of Human and Minority Rights and Social Dialogue, which addresses policy and monitors the status of minorities, also oversees some religious issues.

== Government practices ==
The constitution states parents and legal guardians shall have the right to ensure the religious education of their children in conformity with their own convictions. The law provides for religious education in public schools, but only for the seven traditional groups. Students in primary and secondary schools must attend either classes in one of the seven traditional religions or an alternative civic education class. Parents choose which option is appropriate for their child. The curriculum taught in the religion classes varies regionally, reflecting the number of adherents of a given religion in a specific community. Typically, five interested students is the minimum needed to offer instruction in a particular religion. In areas where individual schools do not meet the minimum number, the Ministry of Education attempts to combine students into regional classes for religious instruction. The Commission for Religious Education appoints religious education instructors from lists of qualified candidates supplied by each religious group. The commission is composed of representatives of each traditional religious group, the Ministry of Education, and the Directorate for Cooperation with Churches and Religious Communities.

The law recognizes restitution claims for religious property confiscated in 1945 or later for registered religious groups only. The law permits individual claims for properties lost by Holocaust victims during World War II, but religious groups may not claim property confiscated prior to 1945. Legally registered endowments may apply for restitution. The law also provides that the Jewish community may receive restitution for heirless property confiscated from Holocaust victims during World War II. Due to the division of the Islamic community between the Islamic Community of Serbia and the Islamic Community in Serbia, Islamic organizations face difficulty in getting property restituted, as it would require the government to recognize one or the other group as the "rightful" Islamic community of the country. As of 2026, the government reports that almost all of the property confiscated by the government of Yugoslavia has been returned.

The government does not keep records of religiously motivated violence, and reporting from individual religious organization is sparse.

According to the Jehovah's Witnesses, public prosecutors rarely prosecuted physical assaults against their members or vandalism against their property as religiously motivated crimes, but rather as simple assault or property violations, which carried lesser penalties under the law than religiously motivated crimes, or else treated incidents as private disputes. Some observers stated they believed prosecutors intentionally filed lesser charges in these cases to minimize the appearance of religious intolerance.

== Societal attitudes ==
Jehovah's Witnesses have reported incidents of assault and harassment against their members.

Translations of antisemitic literature are available from nationalist groups and publishers. Antisemitic literature, such as the Protocols of the Elders of Zion, is available in many bookshops, and antisemitism is present on social media. Some youth groups and internet forums promote antisemitic speech.

Articles critical of non-traditional religious groups regularly appear in online media. Several nontraditional religious leaders reported the media often labeled nontraditional religions as "sects," which the leaders stated contributed to negative stereotyping. Members of Parliament have also labeled nontraditional groups, particularly Protestant groups, as sects.

== See also ==
- Religion in Serbia

== Bibliography ==
- Crampton, R. J. (1997). Eastern Europe in the Twentieth Century - and After. Routledge. ISBN 978-0-415-16423-8.
- Farley, Brigit (2007). "King Aleksandar and the Royal Dictatorship in Yugoslavia". In Fischer, Bernd Jürgen (ed.). Balkan Strongmen: Dictators and Authoritarian Rulers of South Eastern Europe. Purdue University Press. pp. 51–86. ISBN 978-1-55753-455-2.
- Hoptner, Jacob B. (1962). Yugoslavia in Crisis, 1934-1941. Columbia University Press. ISBN 978-1-258-18760-6.
- Roberts, Walter R. (1973). Tito, Mihailović, and the Allies, 1941-1945. Rutgers University Press. ISBN 978-0-8135-0740-8.
- Tomasevich, Jozo (1975). The Chetniks. Stanford University Press. ISBN 978-0-8047-0857-9.
- Tomasevich, Jozo (2001). War and Revolution in Yugoslavia, 1941-1945: Occupation and Collaboration. Stanford University Press. ISBN 0804779244.
- Avramović, Sima (2020). „The Shaping of Law on Religion in Serbia, Gerhard Robbers, and Legal Transplants”. In K. von S. der Decken, A. Günzel (ed.). Staat, Religion, Recht. Festschrift für Gerhard Robbers, Nomos. pp. 493-509. ISBN 978-3-8487-6892-9
