= Eastern Orthodoxy in Serbia =

Christian denomination in Serbia

Eastern Orthodoxy is by far the largest religious denomination in Serbia. According to the 2022 census, there were 5,387,426 adherents of Eastern Orthodoxy in Serbia, making up 81.1% of the population.

The Serbian Orthodox Church is the traditional church of the country and the sole Eastern Orthodox canonical jurisdiction in the territory of Serbia.

== History ==
During the Late antiquity, there were several major Christian centers and episcopal sees in the territory of present-day Serbia, including Sirmium, Singidunum, Viminacium, Naissus, Ulpiana and others. In 535, Byzantine emperor Justinian I created new Archbishopric of Justiniana Prima, centered in the city of Justiniana Prima near present-day town of Lebane in central Serbia.

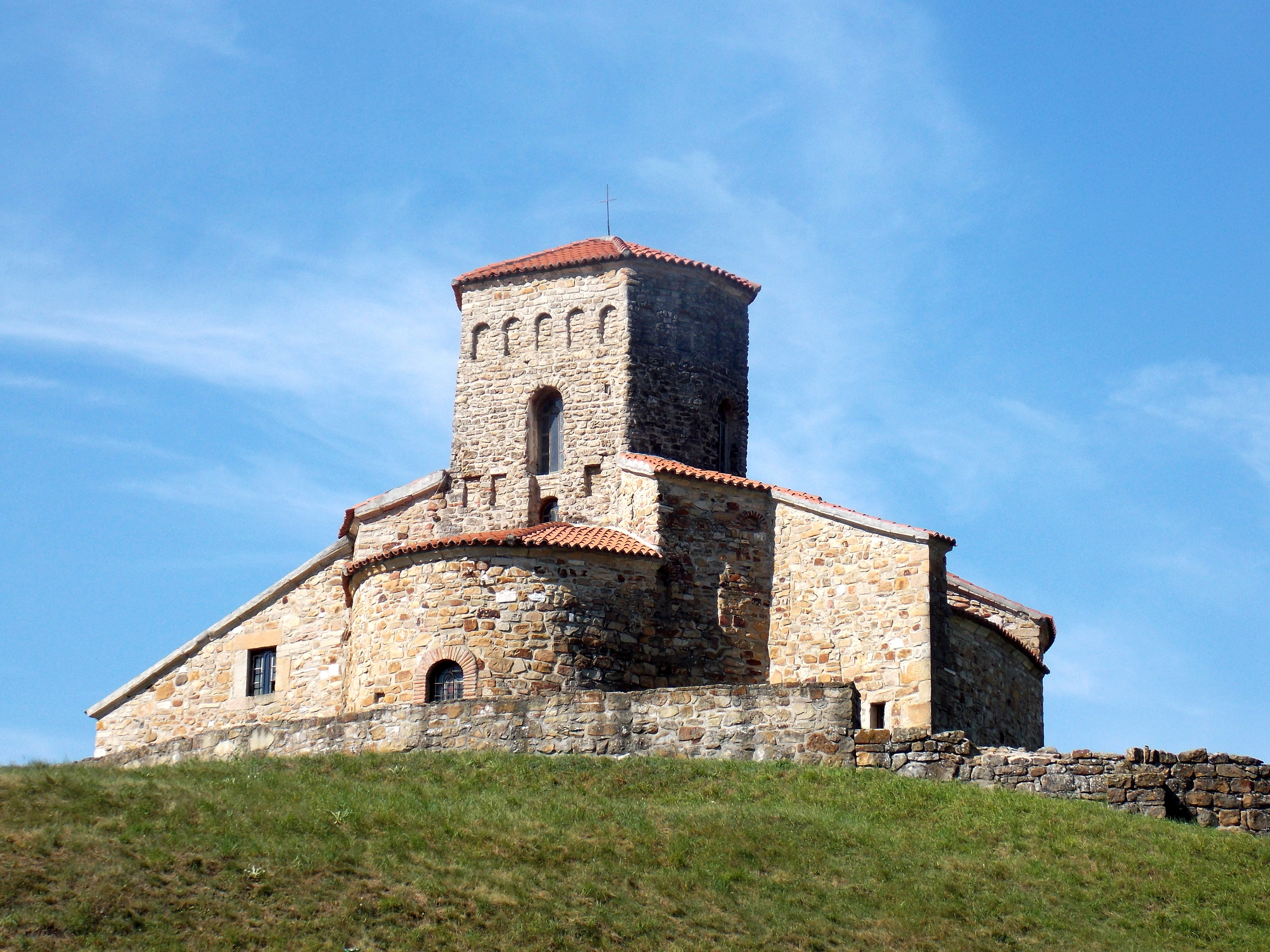
Church of the Holy Apostles Peter and Paul, built around 820, the oldest church building in Serbia

The Christianization of the Serbian lands took place in the 9th century, and Serbia is accounted Christian as of 870. The Serbian bishoprics became part of the Archbishopric of Ohrid, after the Byzantine conquest of the Bulgarian Empire in 1018. The Slavic language gradually replaced Greek as the principal liturgical language.

With the Great Schism in 1054, Serbia remained under jurisdiction of Constantinople, while neighbouring Croatia remained under Rome. The Serbian Archbishopric was given autocephaly in 1219, when Archbishop Sava received recognition from the exiled Ecumenical Patriarch. In 1346, it was raised to the rank of Patriarchate, with the seat in Peć (thus known as the Patriarchate of Peć).

Following the Ottoman conquest of Serbia, most Serbs remained Orthodox, although the Patriarchate of Peć effectively ceased functioning after 1463 and its canonical territory gradually came under the jurisdiction of the Archbishopric of Ohrid and the Ecumenical Patriarchate of Constantinople. Despite this, some Serbian bishops retained considerable autonomy, especially in Zeta and Herzegovina. Efforts to restore the Serbian Church's independence culminated in 1557 when the Patriarchate of Peć was reestablished with Ottoman approval, largely through the influence of Ottoman Grand vizier Mehmed Sokolović, and Makarije Sokolović became patriarch. The restored patriarchate strengthened the spiritual unity of Serbs throughout the Ottoman Empire and even extended into parts of western Bulgaria. In 1594, as a form of retaliation against the Serb rebels, the Ottomans burned the relics of Saint Sava in Belgrade to discourage further Serb resistance. Following repeated Serb uprisings, the Ottomans abolished the Patriarchate of Peć once again in 1766, placing Orthodox Serbs believers under the authority of the Ecumenical Patriarchate of Constantinople.

Many Serbs migrated to the Habsburg monarchy, where the autonomous Metropolitanate of Karlovci was established in 1708 and later elevated to a patriarchate. The Metropolitanate of Belgrade gained autonomy in 1831, received full autocephaly in 1879 after Serbia's independence, while other Serbian ecclesiastical provinces continued to exist in Bosnia, Montenegro, and the Habsburg lands.

Following the formation of the Kingdom of Serbs, Croats, and Slovenes in 1918, the previously separate Serbian Orthodox ecclesiastical jurisdictions were united, resulting in the restoration of a unified Serbian Orthodox Church in 1920.

== Demographics ==
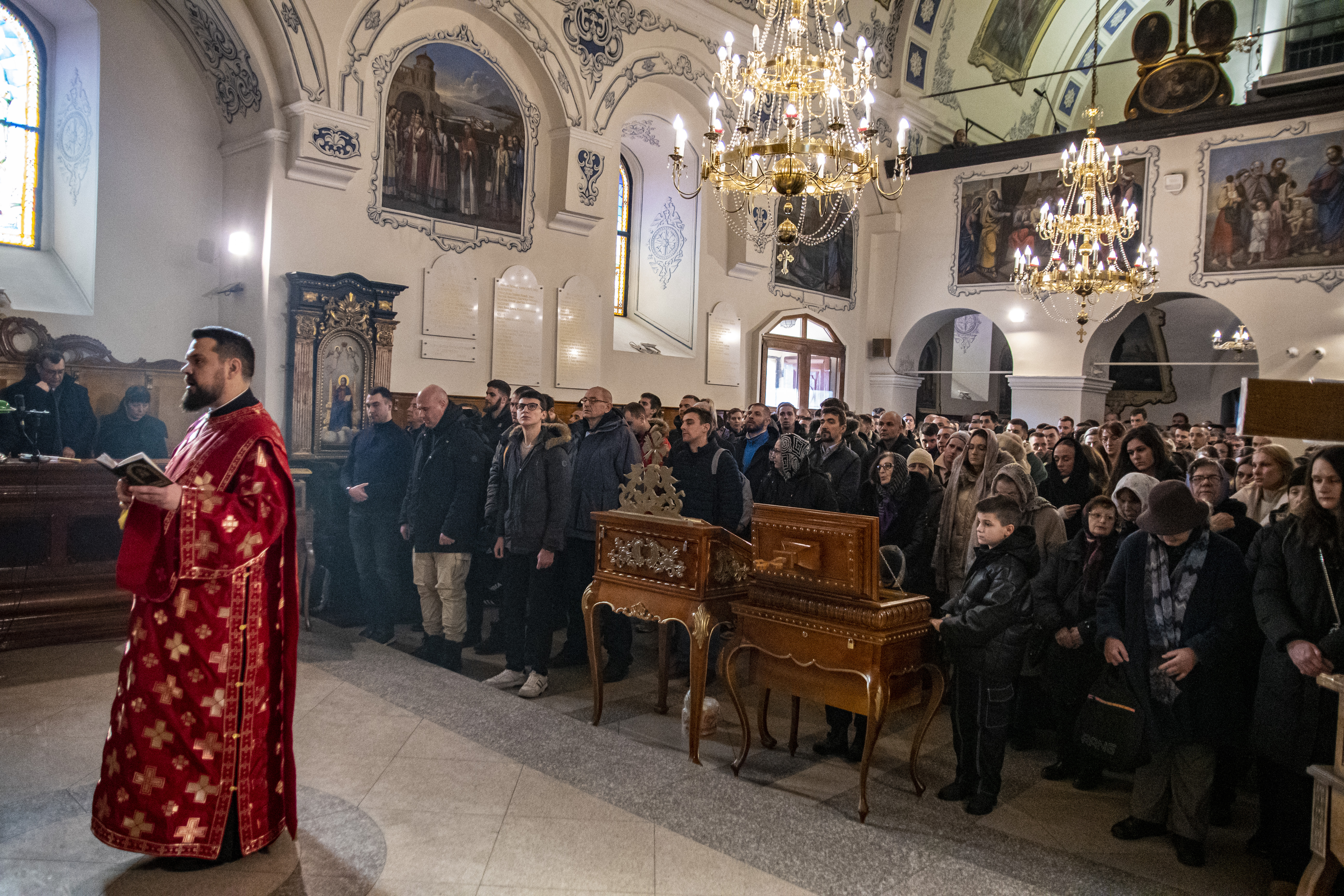
Divine Liturgy at the Church of the Nativity of the Theotokos in Zemun

Eastern Orthodoxy in Serbia has a strong following among ethnic Serbs, Vlachs, Romanians, Montenegrins, Macedonians, and Bulgarians, and is also the largest religious affiliation among Roma, 57% of whom identify as Orthodox Christians. The published data from the 2022 Census included a crosstab of ethnicity and religion, which showed that adherents of Eastern Orthodoxy were divided between the following ethnic groups:

- 5,166,757 Serbs (95.9%)
- 75,546 Roma (1.4%)
- 20,473 Vlachs (0.4%)
- 19,984 Romanians (0.3%)
- 17,295 Montenegrins (0.3%)
- 13,616 Macedonians (0.2%)
- 11,732 Bulgarians (0.2%)
- 62,023 others, undeclared or unknown (1.1%)

== Serbian Orthodox Church ==
Church of Saint Mark in Belgrade

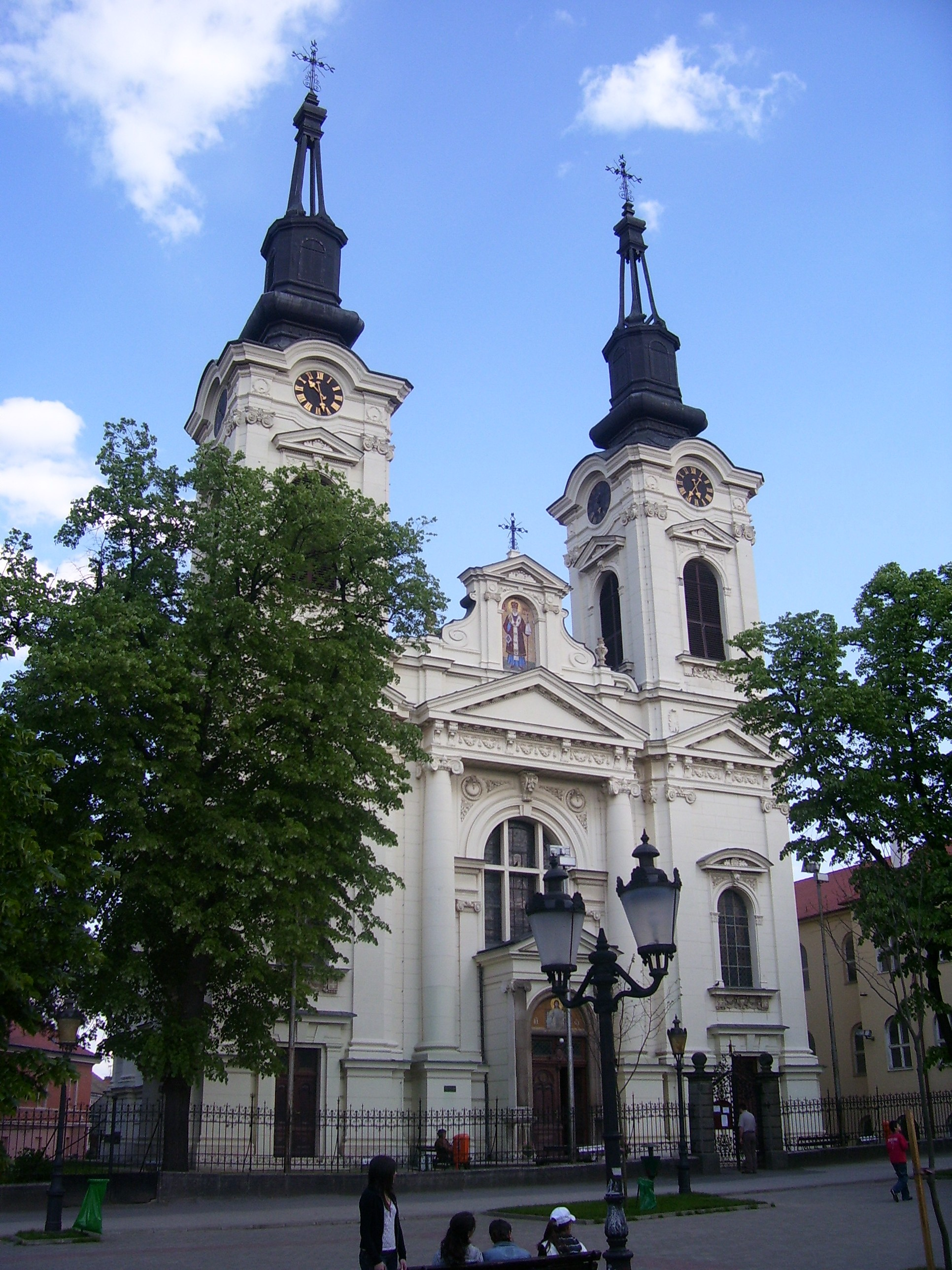
Saint Nicholas Cathedral in Sremski Karlovci

The Serbian Orthodox Church exercises jurisdiction over the territory of Serbia through one archdiocese and 14 dioceses (eparchies):

- Archdiocese of Belgrade and Karlovci; seat in Belgrade and the episcopal see at the Cathedral of Saint Archangel Michael.
- Eparchy of Bačka; seat in Novi Sad and the episcopal see at the Saint George Cathedral.
- Eparchy of Banat; seat in Vršac and the episcopal see at the Saint Nicholas Cathedral.
- Eparchy of Braničevo; seat in Požarevac and the episcopal see at the Cathedral of Archangels Michael and Gabriel.
- Eparchy of Kruševac; seat in Kruševac and the episcopal see at the Saint George Cathedral.
- Eparchy of Mileševa; seat in Prijepolje and the episcopal see at the Saint Basil of Ostrog Cathedral.
- Eparchy of Niš; seat in Niš and the episcopal see at the Holy Trinity Cathedral.
- Eparchy of Raška and Prizren; seat in Gračanica and the episcopal see at the Saint George Cathedral.
- Eparchy of Srem; seat in Sremski Karlovci and the episcopal see at the Saint Nicholas Cathedral.
- Eparchy of Šabac; seat in Šabac and the episcopal see at the Saints Peter and Paul Cathedral.
- Eparchy of Šumadija; seat in Kragujevac and the episcopal see at the Cathedral of the Dormition of the Theotokos.
- Eparchy of Timok; seat in Zaječar and the episcopal see at the Cathedral of Nativity of the Theotokos.
- Eparchy of Valjevo; seat in Valjevo and the episcopal see at the Cathedral of the Resurrection of the Lord.
- Eparchy of Vranje; seat in Vranje and the episcopal see at the Holy Trinity Cathedral.
- Eparchy of Žiča; seat in Kraljevo and the episcopal see at the Cathedral of the Transfiguration of the Lord.

Based on a mutual agreement between the Serbian Orthodox Church and the Romanian Orthodox Church, the Romanian Orthodox Church, through its Diocese of Dacia Felix, is granted right to exercise jurisdiction over ethnic Romanians in Serbia, just as the Serbian Orthodox Church, through its Eparchy of Timișoara, exercises jurisdiction over ethnic Serbs in Romania.

== See also ==
- Religion in Serbia
- Christianity in Serbia
- Eastern Orthodoxy in Europe

== Sources ==
- Charanis, Peter (1969) [1955]. "The Byzantine Empire in the Eleventh Century". A History of the Crusades. Vol. 1 (2nd ed.). Madison: University of Wisconsin Press. pp. 177–219. ISBN 978-0-299-04834-1.
- Ćirković, Sima (2004). The Serbs. Malden: Blackwell Publishing. ISBN 9781405142915.
- Ćorović, Vladimir (1941). "Iсторија српског народа (Istorija srpskog naroda)". Internet, 2001) (in Serbian). Пројекат Растко: Библиотека српске културе; Projekat Rastko: Biblioteka srpske kulture.
- Vlasto, A. P. (1970). The Entry of the Slavs into Christendom: An Introduction to the Medieval History of the Slavs. Cambridge: Cambridge University Press. ISBN 9780521074599.
