= Religion in Serbia =

Religion in Serbia (2022 census)
1. Eastern Orthodoxy (81.1%)
2. Catholicism (3.87%)
3. Protestantism (0.82%)
4. Other Christian (0.89%)
5. Islam (4.19%)
6. Other religions (0.03%)
7. No religion (1.25%)
8. Undeclared (2.55%)
9. Unknown (5.35%)

Serbia has no official religion and freedom of religion is a right defined by the country's Constitution, which also defines all religious communities as equal before the law and separate from the state.

== History ==
Serbia has been a predominantly Christian country since the christianization of Serbs by Clement of Ohrid and Saint Naum in the 9th century. With the Great Schism in 1054, Serbia remained under the jurisdiction of Constantinople, a development that had far-reaching consequences for its religious and cultural evolution. It contributed to the consolidation of Eastern Orthodoxy as the dominant form of Christianity among the Serbs, reinforced Byzantine ecclesiastical, theological, and cultural influences, and laid the foundations for the establishment of an autocephalous Serbian Church in 1219 under Saint Sava, which played a central role in the formation of Serbian ethnic and national identity. The Catholic Church has been present in parts of present-day Serbia since antiquity and the medieval period, but its continuous institutional and demographic presence in the country, particularly in Vojvodina, became more firmly established during and after the incorporation of these areas into the Kingdom of Hungary and later the Habsburg monarchy, especially through the settlement of Catholic populations such as Hungarians, Croats, and Germans. Protestantism appeared significantly later, primarily in the 18th and 19th centuries, when groups such as Slovak Lutheran settlers migrated into Vojvodina.

During the rule of the Ottoman Empire in the Balkans, Sunni Islam became established in the territories of present-day Serbia through Ottoman conquest and centuries of administration. The religion gained followers among parts of the local population, particularly in the southern regions of Sandžak and the Preševo Valley.

== Demographics ==
Serbia is largely a homogeneous Christian country. Eastern Orthodoxy is by far the largest Christian denomination with 81% of population identifying as Orthodox. Meanwhile, Catholicism accounts for roughly 3.8% of the population, while Protestantism represents about 0.8%. Islam, with 4.2% of the population, is the second-largest religion.

A comparatively small portion of the population is non-religious or skeptical, with 1.1% identifying as atheist and an additional 0.1% as agnostic.

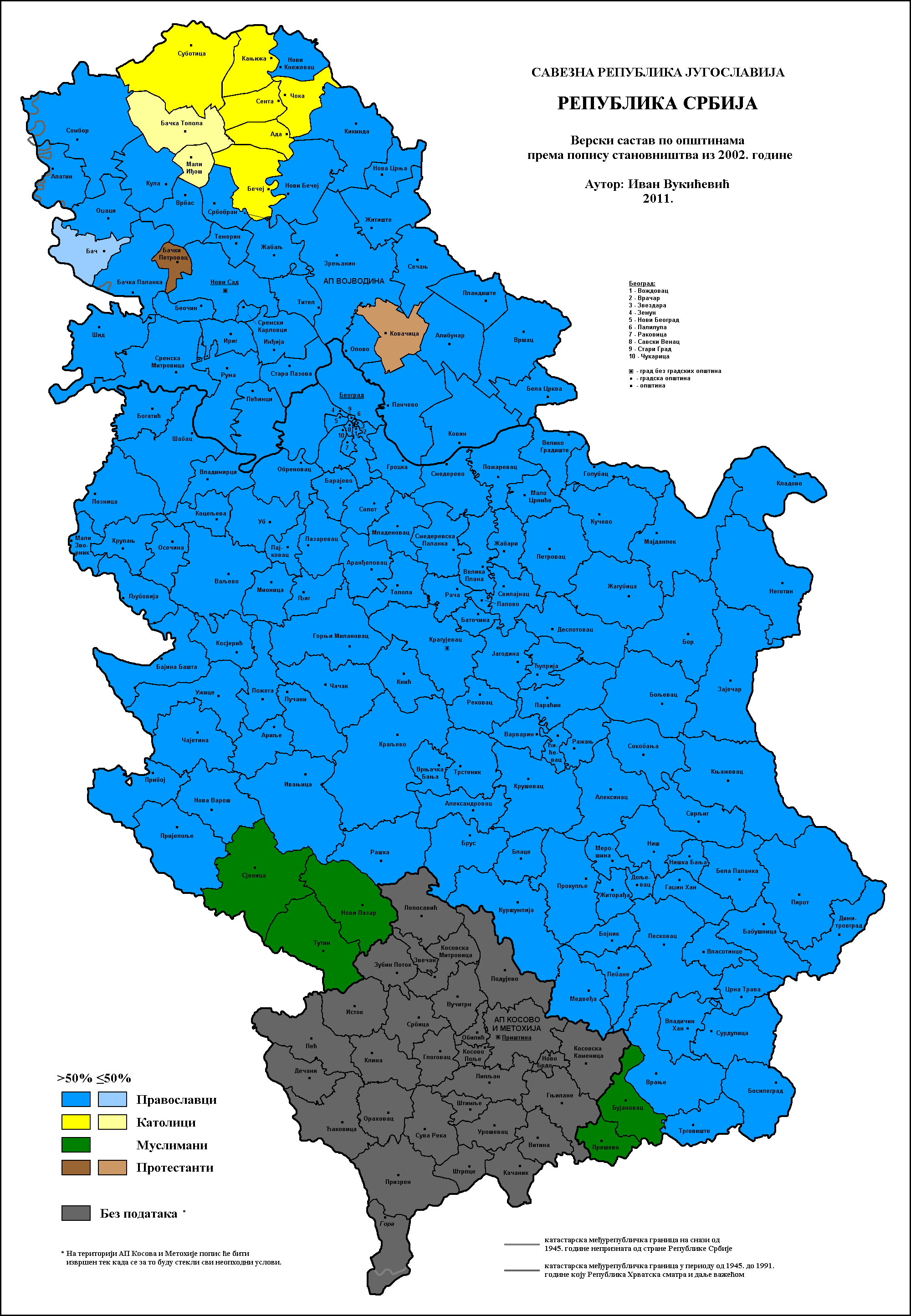
Religious map of Serbia by municipalities, 2011

Religion	1991 Census		2002 Census		2011 Census		2022 Census	
Religion	Adherents	Share	Adherents	Share	Adherents	Share	Adherents	Share
Christianity	6,931,527	89.3%	6,876,279	91.7%	6,555,931	91.2%	5,758,719	86.6%
Eastern Orthodoxy	6,347,026	81.8%	6,371,584	85%	6,079,396	84.6%	5,387,426	81.1%
Catholicism	496,226	6.4%	410,976	5.5%	356,957	4.9%	257,269	3.8%
Protestantism	86,894	1.1%	78,646	1%	71,284	1%	54,678	0.8%
Other Christian	1,381	0.02%	15,073	0.2%	48,294	0.7%	59,346	0.9%
Islam	224,120	2.9%	239,658	3.2%	222,828	3.1%	278,212	4.2%
Judaism	740	0.01%	785	0.01%	578	0.01%	602	0.01%
Other religions^{*}	13,982	0.2%	6,889	0.1%	3,013	0.02%	1,207	0.01%
Atheism	159,642	2%	40,068	0.5%	80,053	1.1%	74,139	1.1%
Agnosticism	159,642	2%	40,068	0.5%	4,010	0.06%	8,654	0.1%
Undeclared	159,642	2%	197,031	2.6%	220,735	3%	169,486	2.5%
Unknown	429,560	5.5%	137,291	1.8%	99,714	1.4%	355,484	5.3%
Note: data shown in the table are for Serbia excluding Kosovo^{*} mainly Eastern religions (Chinese folk religion, Buddhism, and Hinduism)

The adherents of Eastern Orthodoxy are overwhelmingly ethnic Serbs, but also include members of smaller ethnic communities such as Romanians, Vlachs, Montenegrins, Macedonians, and Bulgarians, and Eastern Orthodoxy is also the largest religious affiliation among the country's Roma population. Catholicism is followed primarily by ethnic Hungarians and Croats, while Protestantism is most prevalent among ethnic Slovaks. Islam has a strong following among ethnic Bosniaks and Albanians; in addition, a quarter of the country's Roma population are Muslim.

Religion	Serbs		Hungarians		Bosniaks		Roma		Albanians		Slovaks	
Religion	Number	Share	Number	Share	Number	Share	Number	Share	Number	Share	Number	Share
Christianity	5,232,386	97.6%	175,786	95.3%	82	0.05%	86,905	65.8%	1,017	1.6%	38,114	91.3%
Eastern Orthodoxy	5,166,757	96.4%	2,940	1.6%	77	0.05%	75,546	57.2%	168	0.2%	1,150	2.7%
Catholicism	11,947	0.2%	161,071	87.3%	2	0.0%	4,413	3.3%	829	1.3%	3,032	7.2%
Protestantism	3,951	0.07%	10,639	5.7%	1	0.0%	3,971	3%	3	0.0%	33,488	80.2%
Other Christian	49,731	0.9%	1,136	0.6%	2	0.0%	2,975	2.2%	17	0.0%	444	1%
Islam	4,238	0.1%	21	0.01%	153,197	99.6%	32,973	25%	60,253	97.7%	5	0.01%
Other religions	738	0.01%	71	0.04%	3	0.00%	46	0.03%	7	0.01%	1,664	4.2%
Atheism	47,185	0.9%	1,858	1%	170	0.1%	1,023	0.7%	59	0.09%	599	1.4%
Agnosticism	5,768	0.1%	104	0.05%	19	0.01%	9	0.00%	7	0.01%	54	0.1%
Undeclared	38,207	0.7%	4,321	2.3%	96	0.06%	4,190	3.1%	130	0.2%	1,982	4.7%
Unknown	31,717	0.6%	2,281	1.2%	234	0.01%	6,790	5.1%	214	0.3%	968	2.3%
Note: figures displayed in blue represent the majority religious affiliation for each ethnic group.

Religion	Croats		Yugoslavs		Romanians		Vlachs		Montenegrins		Macedonians	
Religion	Number	Share	Number	Share	Number	Share	Number	Share	Number	Share	Number	Share
Christianity	35,413	90.5%	12,222	45%	22,114	95.9%	20,652	98.3%	17,545	86.7%	13,857	93.8%
Eastern Orthodoxy	1,331	3.4%	7,725	28.4%	19,984	86.7%	20,473	97.4%	17,295	85.4%	13,616	92.2%
Catholicism	33,637	86%	3,551	13.1%	1,570	6.8%	7	0.03%	114	0.5%	26	0.1%
Protestantism	155	0.4%	283	1%	362	1.5%	30	0.1%	25	0.1%	71	0.5%
Other Christian	290	0.7%	663	2.4%	198	0.8%	142	0.6%	111	0.5%	144	1%
Islam	12	0.03%	504	1.8%	7	0.03%	2	0.00%	161	0.8%	229	1.5%
Other religions	14	0.03%	130	0.5%	6	0.02%	3	0.01%	14	0.07%	6	0.04%
Atheism	1,489	3.8%	8,417	31%	162	0.7%	98	0.4%	1,444	7.1%	269	1.8%
Agnosticism	175	0.4%	992	3.6%	31	0.1%	15	0.07%	145	0.7%	28	0.2%
Undeclared	1,348	3,4%	3,113	11.4%	460	2%	145	0.7%	590	2.9%	237	1.6%
Unknown	656	1.6%	1,765	6.5%	264	1.1%	98	0.4%	339	1.6%	141	0.9%
Note: figures displayed in blue represent the majority religious affiliation for each ethnic group.

== Religions ==
Church of Saint Sava in Belgrade, one of the largest Orthodox churches in the world

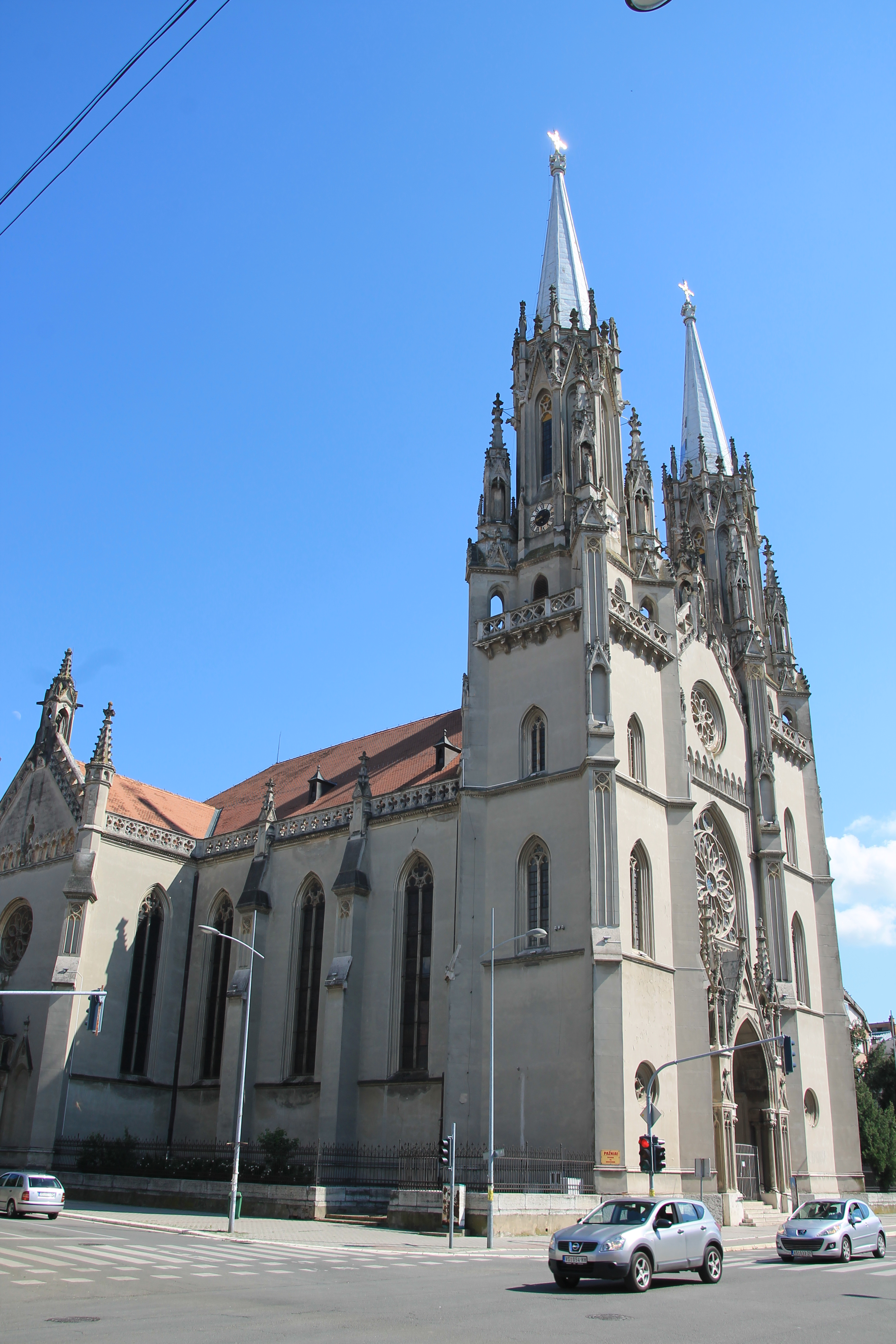
Catholic Church of Saint Gerhard de Sangredo in Vršac

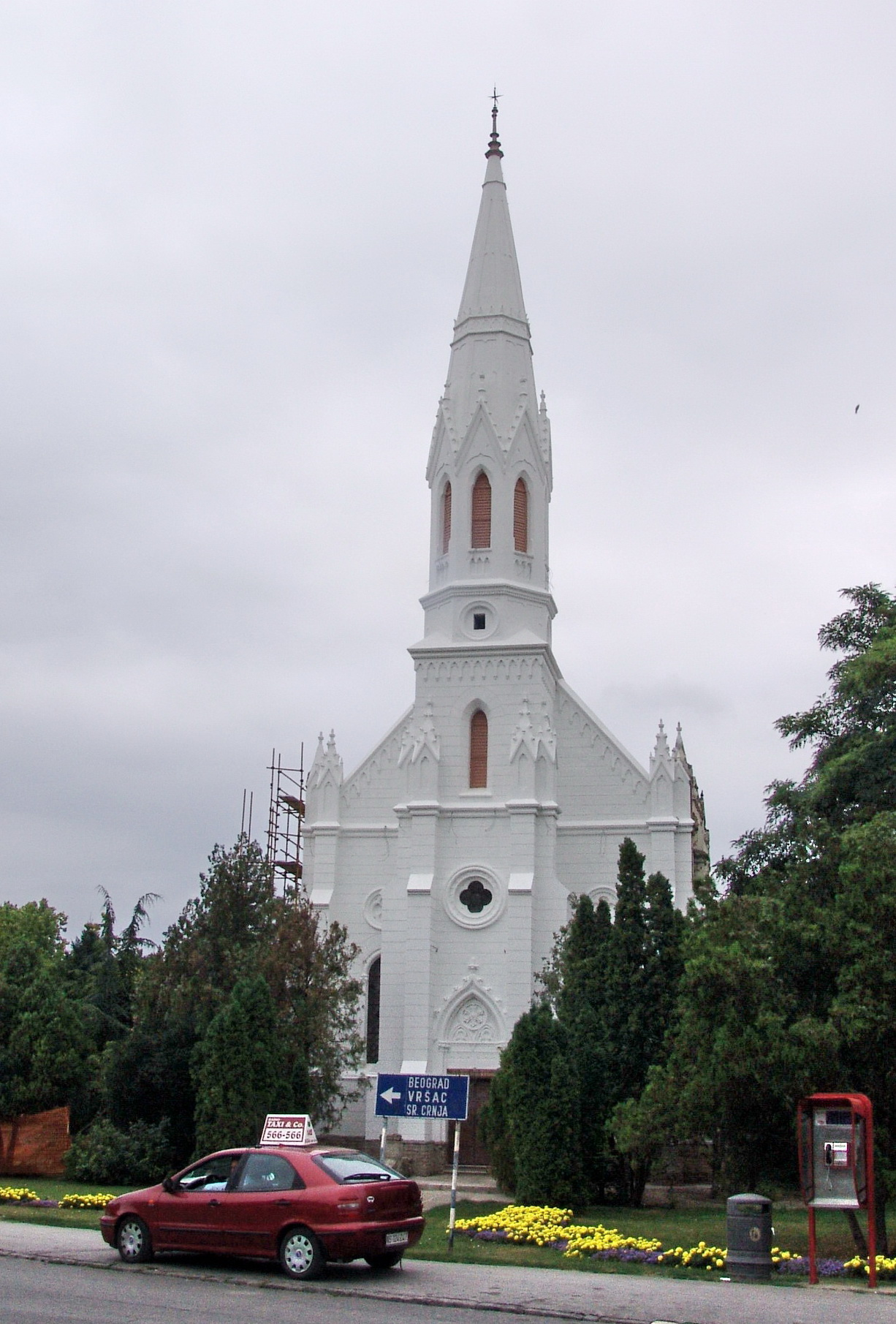
Protestant (Calvinist) church in Zrenjanin

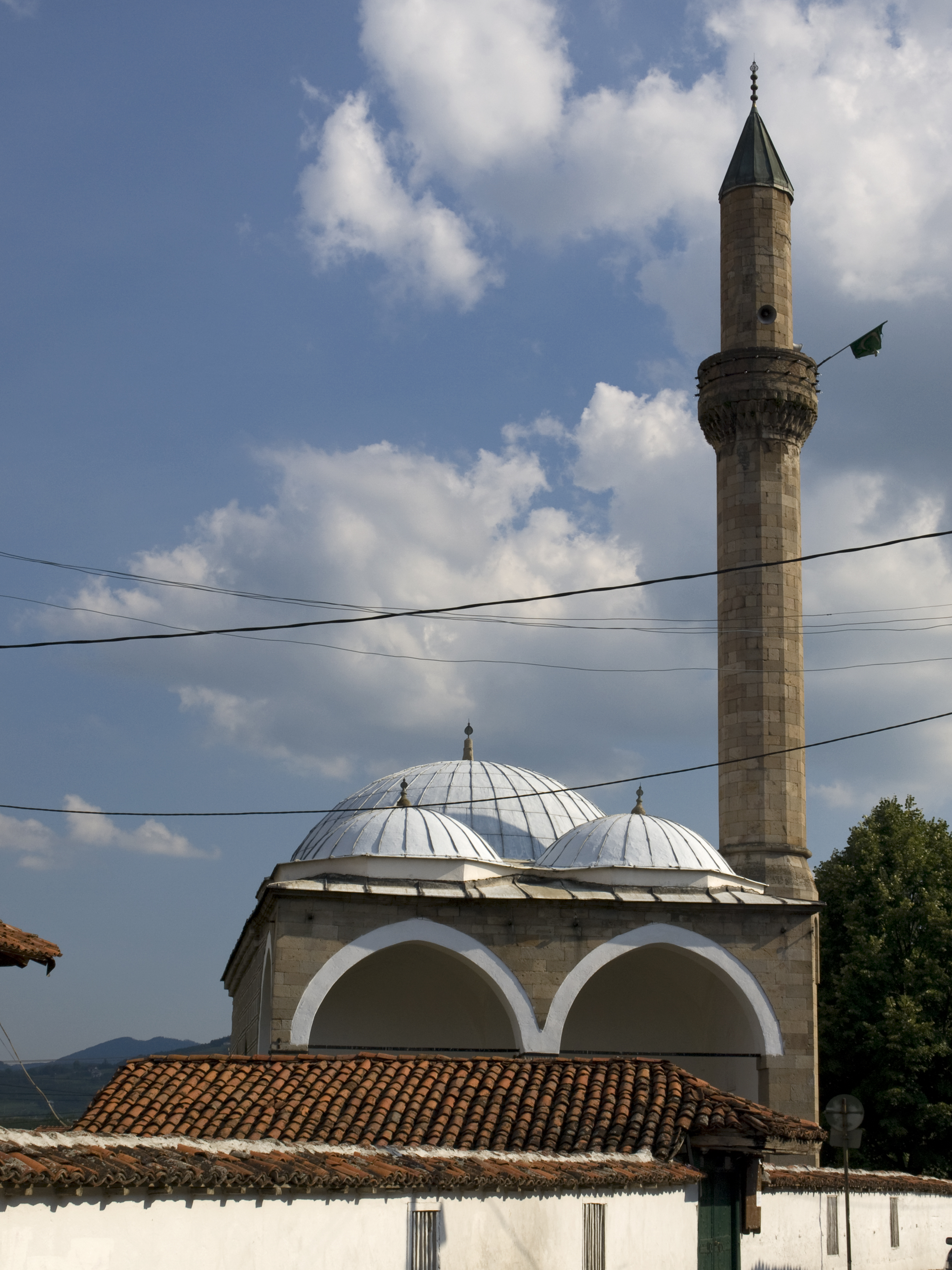
Altun-Alem Mosque in Novi Pazar

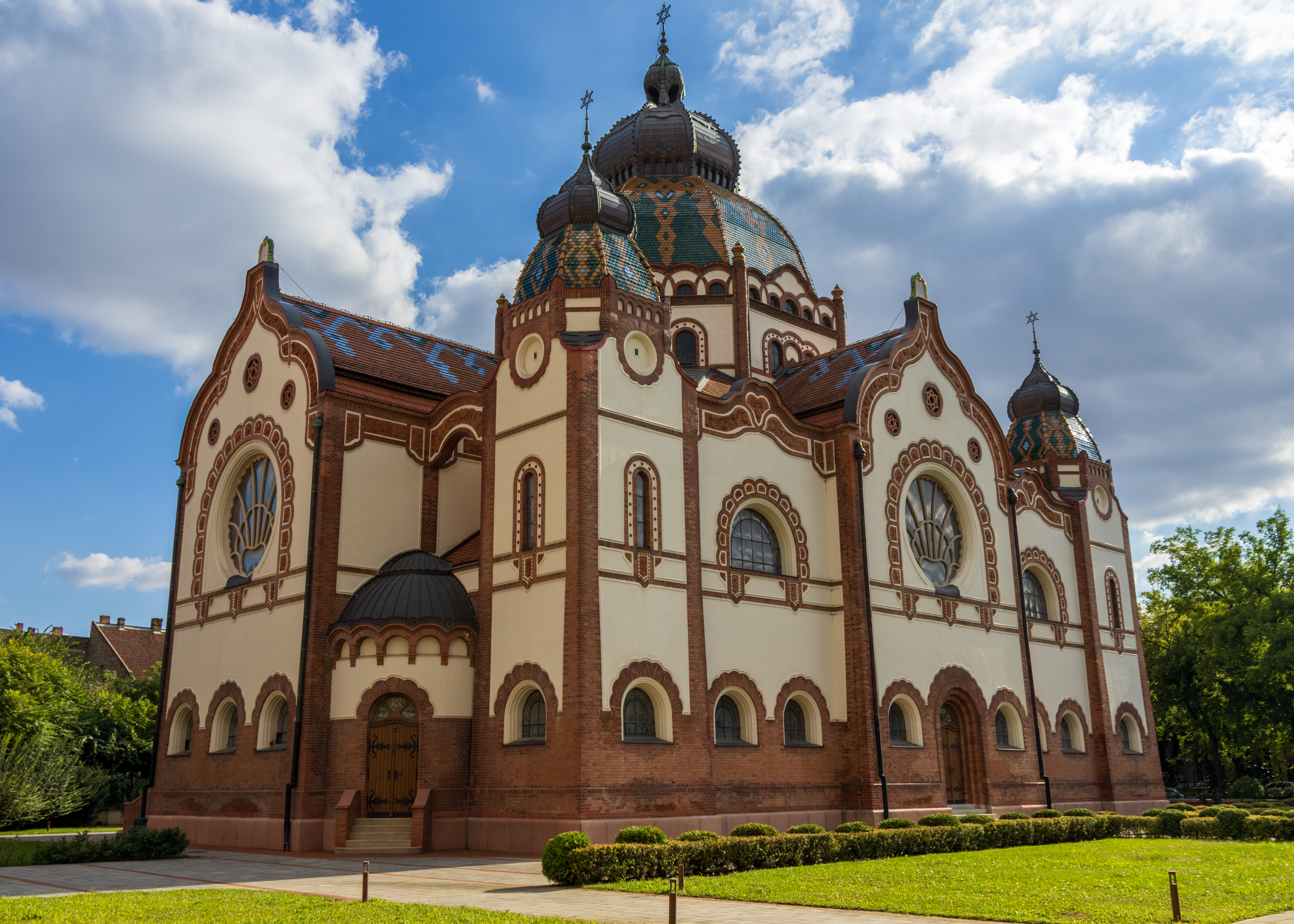
Jakab and Komor Square Synagogue in Subotica, second largest synagogue building in Europe, repurposed to a cultural venue

=== Christianity ===
Christianity is the most widely professed religion in Serbia, which has been a predominantly Christian country since the christianization of Serbs in the 9th century.

==== Eastern Orthodoxy ====
Eastern Orthodoxy is the most widely professed Christian denomination and is prevalent throughout most of Serbia.

The Serbian Orthodox Church is the traditional church of the country and one of the ecclesiastically independent Eastern Orthodox churches. Led by the Serbian Patriarch, it is the sole jurisdiction for Orthodox Christians not only in the territory of Serbia but also in Bosnia-Herzegovina, Montenegro, Croatia, Kosovo, and Slovenia. Outside its canonical territory, it serves the Serb diaspora in Europe, the Americas, and Australia. Globally, the Serbian Orthodox Church has approximately 8 million adherents. During the centuries of Ottoman rule, it was the only major Serbian institution to retain continuity. Through its monasteries and clergy, it preserved the Serbian language, literacy, written history, and ethnic consciousness when all other forms of statehood and education had been extinguished. When the Principality of Serbia gained independence from the Ottoman Empire, Orthodoxy became crucial in defining Serbian identity, instead of language which was shared by other South Slavs. The modern Serbian Orthodox Church was a result of the unification in 1920 of the Metropolitanate of Belgrade, Patriarchate of Karlovci, and Metropolitanate of Montenegro.

==== Catholicism ====
Catholicism is a minor Christian denomination in Serbia. Catholics in Serbia have historically been overwhelmingly Roman Catholic, with only a tiny fraction being Greek Catholic. The vast majority of Catholics in the country are concentrated in northern Vojvodina, with a Catholic majority at the municipal level found in the municipalities of Kanjiža, Senta, and Ada, where ethnic Hungarians constitute an absolute majority of the population. Subotica (Serbia's fifth-largest city), Bečej, Bačka Topola, and Čoka have a relative Catholic majority.

Catholicism has had a continuous presence in the territory of present-day Serbia since the Middle Ages and remains an important component of the religious and cultural heritage of Vojvodina. Numerous Catholic churches and religious institutions were established during the Habsburg era.

==== Protestantism ====
Protestants in Serbia have historically been made up of Magisterial Protestants (Lutherans and Calvinists), developed within the framework of Central European Protestant traditions, which continue to influence their liturgy and church governance. The Slovak Evangelical Church of the Augsburg Confession, a Lutheran church, is a principal Protestant church in the country. In recent decades, however, Adventists and Evangelical Protestants (Pentecostals and Baptists) have expanded their presence and now account for roughly one-fifth of the Protestant population.

The vast majority of Protestants in Serbia are concentrated in Vojvodina, with the highest proportions at the municipal level found in the municipalities of Bački Petrovac and Kovačica, where ethnic Slovaks constitute either an absolute or a relative majority of the population. A sizeable Protestant population is also found in Novi Sad, the country's second-largest city.

=== Islam ===
Islam is a minority religion and the second largest religion in the country after Christianity. It began to spread rapidly following the Ottoman conquest of Serbia in the 15th century, gradually becoming the dominant religion in certain regions. The largest concentration of Muslims in Serbia could be found in the Sandžak region (city of Novi Pazar and municipalities of Tutin, Sjenica, and Prijepolje) and in the Preševo Valley (municipalities of Preševo and Bujanovac).

Islamic traditions influenced local customs, cuisine, and elements of everyday life in the regions where it became established during Ottoman administration. Many historic mosques remain important cultural monuments and are protected as part of Serbia's heritage.

=== Judaism ===
According to data from 2022 census, 602 people declared their religion as Judaism, mostly in the cities of Belgrade (365), Novi Sad (66), and Subotica (54). The only remaining functioning synagogue in the country is the Belgrade Synagogue. The community flourished and reached a peak of 33,000 in the Interwar period, of whom almost 90% were living in Belgrade and Vojvodina. About two-thirds of Serbian Jews were murdered in The Holocaust. After the war, most of the remaining Serbian Jewish population emigrated, mainly to Israel.

== Irreligion ==
About 1.1% of the Serbian population is atheist. Religiosity is lowest in large urban areas such as Belgrade and Novi Sad (with 2.5% and 3% of population declared atheists, respectively) and highest in rural parts of the country, where atheism is generally at or below 0.1%.

In a 2009 Gallup poll, 44% of respondents in Serbia answered 'no' to the question "Is religion an important part of your daily life?"

== Role of religion in public life ==
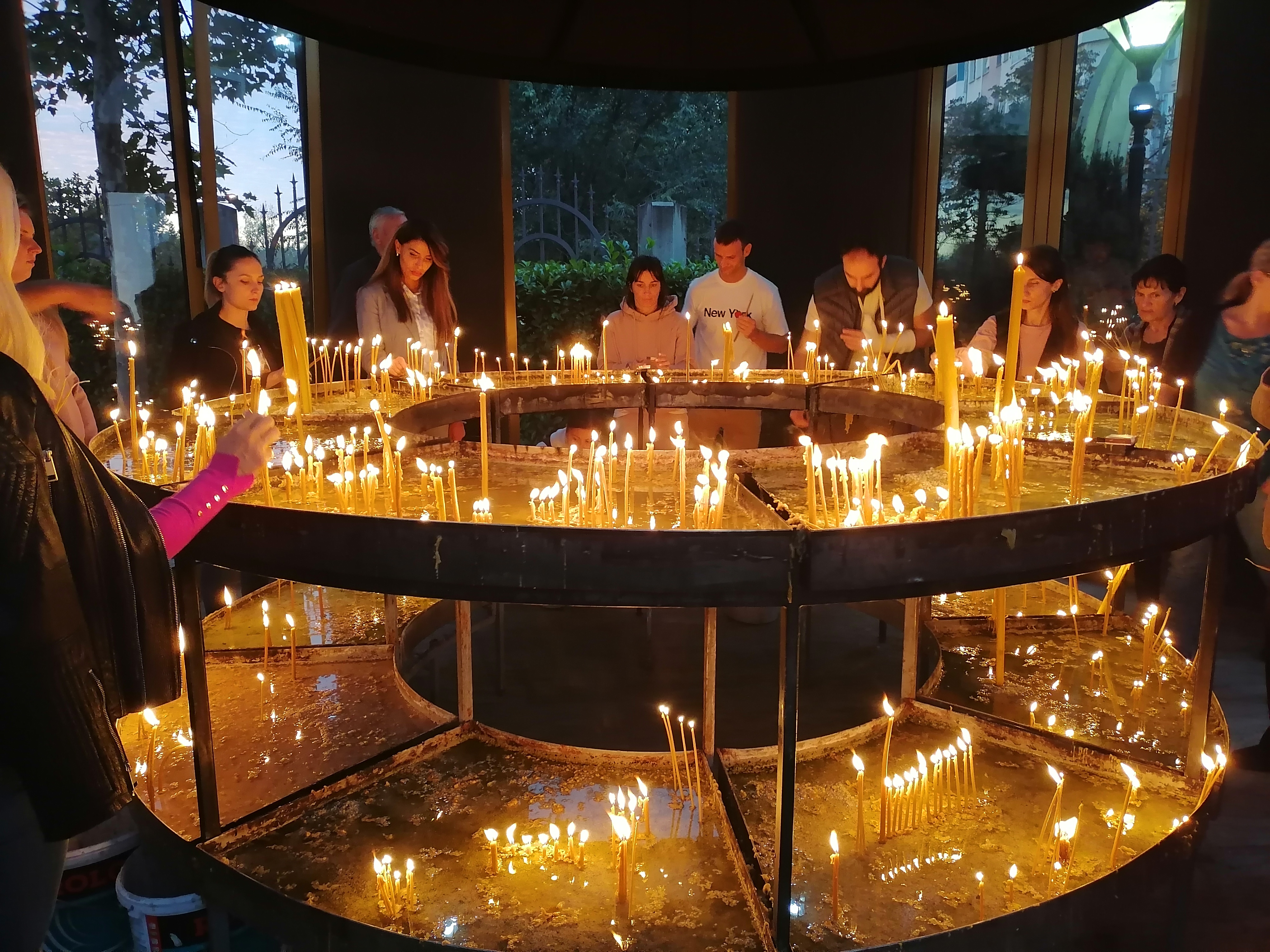
Lighting of candles at the Orthodox church in Belgrade

Public schools allow religious teaching in cooperation with religious communities having agreements with the state, but attendance is not mandated. Religion classes (Serbian: veronauka) are organized in public elementary and secondary schools, most commonly coordinated with the Serbian Orthodox Church, but also with the Catholic Church and Islamic Community of/in Serbia.

Public holidays in Serbia also include the religious festivals of Eastern Orthodox Christmas and Easter. Saint Sava's Day is a working holiday celebrated as a Day of Spirituality as well as Day of Education. Adherents of other religions and denominations are legally allowed to celebrate their religious holidays.

== Religious freedom ==
The Constitution of Serbia establish freedom of religion, forbid the establishment of a state religion, and outlaw religious discrimination. It states the freedom to express one's religion or beliefs may be restricted by law only as necessary to protect the lives and health of the people, the morals of democratic society, freedoms and rights guaranteed by the constitution, or public safety and order or prevent incitement of religious, national, or racial hatred.

In 2023, the country was scored 4 out of 4 for religious freedom, i.e. on the question "Are individuals free to practice and express their religious faith or nonbelief in public and private?".

The law establishes a two-tiered system of religious organizations, distinguishing between "traditional churches and religious communities" and "non-traditional religious communities". Although registration with the state is not required for religious groups to practice, registered groups are granted certain privileges. Independent observers have criticized the system as discriminatory, particularly because non-traditional groups are frequently referred to as "sects" in the media.

== See also ==
- Religion in Vojvodina

== Sources ==
- Kuburić, Z., 2010. Verske zajednice u Srbiji i verska distanca. CEIR—Centar za empirijska istraživanja religije.
- Radić, Radmila (2007). "Serbian Christianity". The Blackwell Companion to Eastern Christianity. Malden, MA: Blackwell Publishing. pp. 231–248. ISBN 9780470766392.
- Radisavljević-Ćiparizović, D., 2002. Religija i svakodnevni život: vezanost ljudi za religiju i crkvu u Srbiji krajem devedesetih. Srbija krajem milenijuma: Razaranje društva, promene i svakodnevni život.
- Radulović, L.B., 2012. Religija ovde i sada: revitalizacije religije u Srbiji. Srpski geneaološki centar, Odeljenje za etnologiju i antropologiju Filozofskog fakulteta.
- Blagojević, M., 2011. „Aktuelna religioznost građana Srbije “, u A. Mladenović (prir.). Religioznost u Srbiji 2010, pp. 43–72.
- Đorđević, D.B., 2005. Religije i veroispovesti nacionalnih manjina u Srbiji. Sociologija, 47(3), pp. 193–212.
- Đukić, V., 2008. Religije Srbije–mreža dijaloga i saradnje.
- Ilić, A., 2013. Odnos religije i društva u današnjoj Srbiji. Religija i Tolerancija, 1(3).
- Kuburić, Z. and Gavrilović, D., 2013. Verovanje i pripadanje u savremenoj Srbiji. Religija i Tolerancija, (1).
