= Cathedral of St. John of Nepomuk, Zrenjanin =

Cathedral of Saint John Nepomuk
- Nepomuki Szent János Székesegyház; Катедрала Светог Ивана Непомука
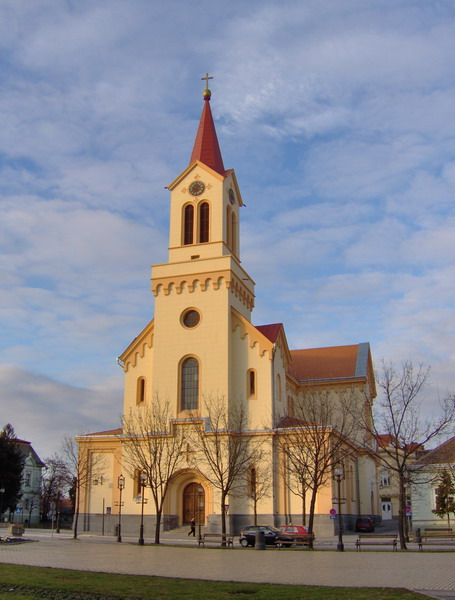
- Cathedral of Saint John Nepomuk
- 45°22′51″N 20°23′26″E
- Location: Zrenjanin
- Country: Serbia
- Denomination: Roman Catholic Church

History
- Status: Cathedral
- Founded: 1867
- Dedication: John of Nepomuk

Architecture
- Functional status: Active
- Heritage designation: Monument of Culture of Great Importance
- Architect: Franz Xaver Brandeisz
- Style: Neoclassical

Administration
- Diocese: Diocese of Zrenjanin

Clergy
- Bishop: Mirko Štefković

The Cathedral of Saint John of Nepomuk (Serbian: Катедрала светог Ивана Непомука, romanized: Katedrala svetog Ivana Nepomuka; Hungarian: Nepomuki Szent János Székesegyház), is the Roman Catholic in Zrenjanin, Serbia. It is under jurisdiction of the Diocese of Zrenjanin and serves as its cathedral church.

== History ==
For the duration of the Ottoman rule (1552–1718) there stood a mosque, but was razed down by the Austrians following Turkish withdrawal from the city and Banat. However, this is not the first cathedral built following the removal of the mosque. Prior to the cathedral seen today, a Baroque-style church, built in 1768, stood in its place. Over the next century, the building deteriorated badly and the authorities decided to build a new one. The construction of the present-day cathedral commenced in 1864 by the project of Franz Xaver Brandeisz, who also built several churches in Banat, and lasted four years.

== Architecture ==
The Zrenjanin Cathedral was built in the Neoclassical style. The interior was decorated by Josef Goigner from Tyrol and the cathedral features a pipe organ made in Timișoara, in 1907. Windows are decorated with stained glass. Due to the cathedral's size, the steeple can be seen from most parts of the city.

== See also ==
- Catholic Church in Serbia
- List of cathedrals in Serbia
