= Archbishop of Belgrade =

Term Archbishop of Belgrade may refer to:

- Serbian Orthodox Archbishop of Belgrade, head of the Metropolitanate of Belgrade.
- Roman Catholic Archbishop of Belgrade, head of the Archdiocese of Belgrade.

== See also ==
- Archbishopric of Belgrade (disambiguation)
- Archdiocese of Belgrade (disambiguation)
- Metropolitanate of Belgrade (disambiguation)
- Eastern Orthodoxy in Serbia
- Catholic Church in Serbia
