= Diocese of Smederevo =

Diocese of Smederevo may refer to:

- Serbian Orthodox Diocese of Smederevo, former diocese (eparchy) of the Serbian Orthodox Church
- Roman Catholic Diocese of Smederevo, former diocese of the Catholic Church in Serbia

== See also ==
- Smederevo
- Eastern Orthodoxy in Serbia
- Catholic Church in Serbia
- Archdiocese of Belgrade (disambiguation)
