= List of Catholic dioceses in Serbia =

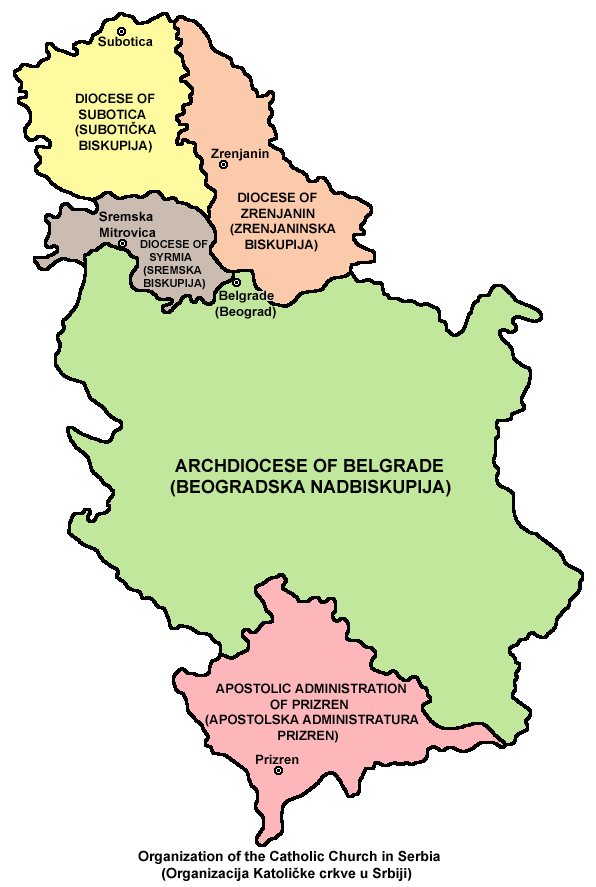
Catholic dioceses in Serbia

The Catholic Church in Serbia consists of several Latin Catholic and one Eastern Catholic jurisdictions. The Latin Catholic hierarchy consists of one ecclesiastical province with archdiocese centered in the capital city of Belgrade, with two suffragan dioceses, in Subotica and Zrenjanin. Also, there is the separate Diocese of Syrmia, suffragan to the Archdiocese of Đakovo-Osijek (metropolitan province centered in Croatia). The only Eastern Catholic jurisdiction is the Greek Catholic Eparchy of Ruski Krstur of the Byzantine Rite. There is also an Apostolic Nunciature as papal diplomatic representation in Serbia.

== Roman Catholic ==
=== Ecclesiastical Province of Belgrade ===
- Archdiocese of Belgrade
  - Diocese of Subotica
  - Diocese of Zrenjanin

=== Ecclesiastical Province of Đakovo–Osijek (in Croatia) ===
- Diocese of Srijem

== Greek Catholic ==
- Greek Catholic Church in Croatia and Serbia
  - Greek Catholic Eparchy of Ruski Krstur

== See also ==
- International Bishops' Conference of Saints Cyril and Methodius

== Sources and external links ==
- Conference of the Saints Cyril and Methodius
- Catholic Archdiocese of Belgrade
- Bishopric of Subotica
- Bishopric of Zrenjanin
- Catholic-Hierarchy entry
- Bishopric of Syrmia
