= Archbishopric of Belgrade =

Archbishopric of Belgrade may refer to:

- Serbian Orthodox Archdiocese of Belgrade, central diocese of the Metropolitanate of Belgrade from 1831 to 1920.
- Roman Catholic Archdiocese of Belgrade, central diocese of Roman Catholic Church in Serbia.

== See also ==
- Archbishop of Belgrade
- Archdiocese of Belgrade
- Metropolitanate of Belgrade (disambiguation)
- Eastern Orthodoxy in Serbia
- Catholic Church in Serbia
