= Santa Maria Stella Maris =

- Church of Saint Mary Star of the Sea
- Parrocchia Santa Maria Stella Maris
- Location within Lazio
- 41°44′17″N 12°17′30″E
- Location: Viale dei Promontori 113, Lido di Ostia, Rome
- Country: Italy
- Language: Italian
- Denomination: Catholic
- Tradition: Roman Rite
- Website: stellamarisostia.it

History
- Status: titular church, parish church
- Dedication: Our Lady, Star of the Sea
- Consecrated: 1977

Architecture
- Functional status: active
- Architect: Ennio Canino
- Architectural type: Modern
- Years built: 1977

Administration
- Diocese: Rome

Santa Maria Stella Maris, also called Santa Maria Stella Maris a Mostacciano or Santa Maria Stella Maris a Castel Palocco, is a 20th-century parochial church and titular church in Lido di Ostia, dedicated to Our Lady, Star of the Sea.

== History ==
Santa Maria Stella Maris was built in 1977 to a modernist design by Ennio Canino

Pope John Paul II visited in 1999.

On 7 December 2024, Pope Francis made it a titular church to be held by a cardinal-priest.

Cardinal-priests

- Ladislav Nemet (2024 – present)
