= International Bishops' Conference of Saints Cyril and Methodius =

Assembly of Catholic bishops in Southeastern Europe

The International Bishops' Conference of Saints Cyril and Methodius (Latin: Conferentia Episcoporum Internationalis SS. Cyrilli et Methodii; Serbian: Међународна бискупска конференција св. Ћирила и Методија, romanized: Međunarodna biskupska konferencija sv. Ćirila i Metodija; Macedonian: Меѓународна бискупска конференција на Светите Кирил и Методиј; Albanian: Konferenca Ndërkombëtare Ipeshkvnore e Shenjtorëve Kirili dhe Metodi) is a cross-border episcopal conference of the Catholic Church in Serbia, Kosovo, Montenegro, and North Macedonia. It is composed of all active and retired bishops from the four countries. Beside the bishops of the Latin Church, it also includes bishops of the two eparchies for the Greek Catholics.

As of 2025, the President of the Conference is the Archbishop of Belgrade Ladislav Nemet, since 2016. The conference is a member of the Council of the Bishops' Conferences of Europe.

== Members ==
Serbia:

- Cardinal Ladislav Nemet – Roman Catholic Archdiocese of Belgrade
  - Archbishop emeritus Stanislav Hočevar
- Bishop Ferenc Fazekas – Roman Catholic Diocese of Subotica
  - Bishop emeritus János Pénzes
- Bishop Mirko Štefković – Roman Catholic Diocese of Zrenjanin
- Bishop Fabijan Svalina – Roman Catholic Diocese of Srijem
  - Bishop emeritus Đuro Gašparović
- Bishop Đura Džudžar – Greek Catholic Eparchy of Ruski Krstur

Kosovo:

- Bishop Dodë Gjergji – Roman Catholic Diocese of Prizren-Pristina

Montenegro:

- Archbishop Rrok Gjonlleshaj – Roman Catholic Archdiocese of Bar
  - Archbishop emeritus Zef Gashi
- Bishop Mladen Vukšić – Roman Catholic Diocese of Kotor
  - Bishop emeritus Ilija Janjić

North Macedonia:

- Bishop Kiro Stojanov – Roman Catholic Diocese of Skopje and the Greek Catholic Eparchy of Strumica-Skopje

== List of presidents ==
- Stanislav Hočevar (2004–2011)
- Zef Gashi (2011–2016)
- Ladislav Nemet (2016–present)

== See also ==
- Catholic Church in Serbia
- Catholic Church in Montenegro
- Catholic Church in Kosovo
- Catholic Church in North Macedonia
