= Ladislav Nemet =

Serbian Catholic archbishop (born 1956)

His Eminence Ladislav Nemet S.V.D.
- Cardinal, Metropolitan Archbishop of Belgrade
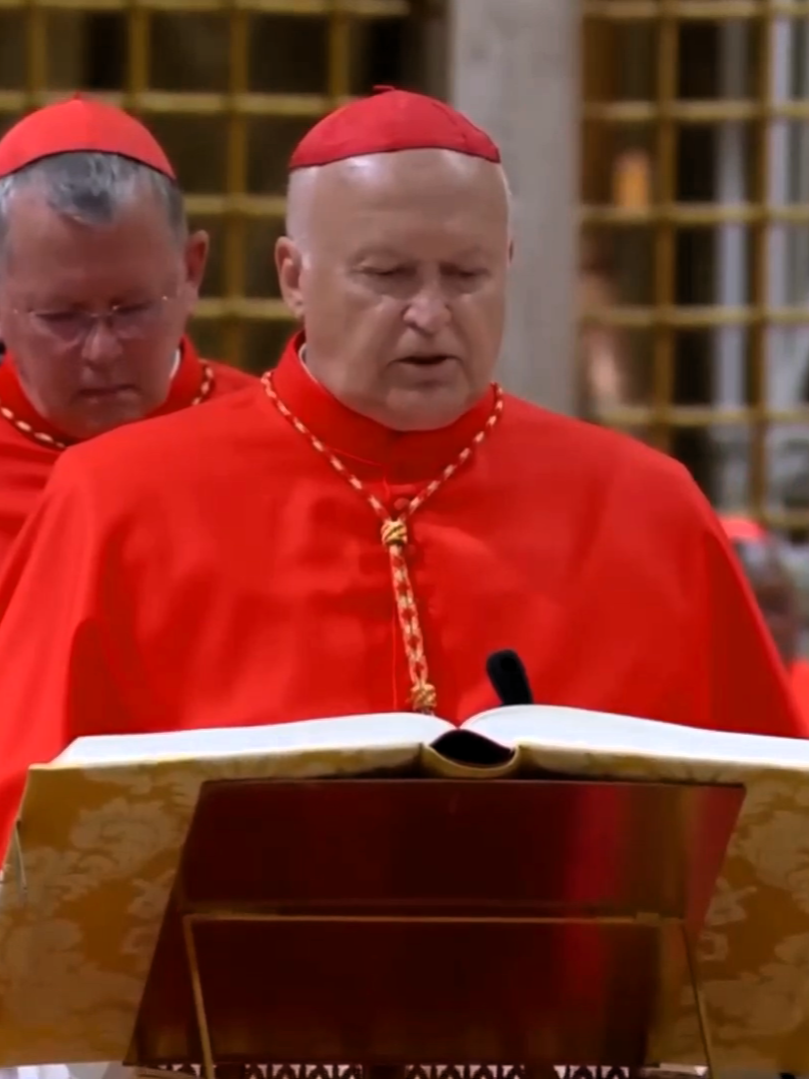
- Német at the 2025 papal conclave
- Church: Catholic
- Archdiocese: Belgrade
- Appointed: 5 November 2022
- Predecessor: Stanislav Hočevar
- Other post: Cardinal-Priest of Santa Maria Stella Maris (2024–)
- Previous post: Bishop of Zrenjanin (2008–22)

Orders
- Ordination: 1 May 1983 by Matiša Zvekanović
- Consecration: 5 July 2008 by Péter Erdő
- Created cardinal: 7 December 2024 by Pope Francis
- Rank: Cardinal-Priest

Personal details
- Born: 7 September 1956 (age 70) Odžaci, FPR Yugoslavia
- Education: Catholic University of Lublin (MA); Pontifical Gregorian University (PhD)
- Coat of arms

Ladislav Nemet SVD (Serbian: Ладислав Немет, Hungarian: Német László; born 7 September 1956) is a Hungarian-Serbian prelate of the Catholic Church who has worked in Serbia as Archbishop of Belgrade since November 2022 and before that as the Bishop of Zrenjanin (Note: Hungarian-language sources identify Zrenjanin as "Nagybecskerek".) from 2008 to 2022. He is a member of the Society of the Divine Word (Verbites). He was made a cardinal on 7 December 2024 by Pope Francis.

Before becoming a bishop he was educated and filled positions in several countries, studying in Poland and Rome, working as a missionary and pastor in the Philippines, teaching and collaborating on the Vatican's diplomatic efforts in Austria, doing pastoral work and teaching in Croatia, and then taking on several assignments in Hungary. He has credited his time in Catholic countries such as Poland and the Philippines with strengthening him for work in his episcopal assignments where he is part of a religious minority. He has been the President of the International Episcopal Conference of Saints Cyril and Methodius since 2016.

== Biography ==
=== Early years and career ===
Ladislav Nemet was born on 7 September 1956 in Odžaci, then in the People's Republic of Serbia, Yugoslavia, into a family of ethnic Hungarians, a significant group in the multi-ethnic Vojvodina province; Nemet refers to himself as a Hungarian. (Note: A Hungarian interviewer referred to him as "a Hungarian cardinal, who is one of the pastors serving in another country, Serbia" and in replying Nemet said "I serve in Belgrade as a Hungarian". A Hungarian publication claimed him with the headline "College of Cardinals Expands With Hungarian Cardinal".) His role models were a local priest and an uncle who was secretly a Verbite in Hungary under the Communists, who recommended the order as a path to broader experience, telling Nemet that "a diocese is too small for you".

He attended the secondary school Gymnasium Paulinum in Subotica from 1971 to 1976. He joined the Society of the Divine Word, completed his studies in philosophy and theology in Pieniezno, Poland, and there took his perpetual vows on 8 September 1982. He received his master's degree from the Catholic University of Lublin on 7 April 1983. He was ordained a priest in Odžaci on 17 April 1983. He spent his first two years as a priest doing pastoral work in Croatia.

He studied at the Pontifical Gregorian University in Rome from 1985 to 1987. While there he worked in a parish in Fiumicino and was thrilled to experience a parish of young people with an average age of 35 and with many active community groups of a sort unknown in Yugoslavia. He worked as a missionary in the Philippines and a chaplain at the University of San Carlos in Cebu City from 1987 to 1990, He later said he learned how the shortage of priests meant that "the laity do much more for the church than the official structures", something "incomprehensible" to Europeans who are "bishop and priest focused".

He returned to Rome and obtained a doctorate in dogmatic theology from the Gregorian in 1994. He spent the next ten years in Austria. He taught dogmatic theology at the Philosophical-Theological College of St. Gabriel and was prefect of the theology students. From 1994 to 2003 he also supported pastoral efforts and was a chaplain at Maria Enzersdorf in Mödling. He worked for the Mission of the Holy See in Vienna at its representation to the United Nations and specialized agencies from 2000 to 2004 and at the same time taught as professor of Jesuit faculty of theology in Zagreb.

He was provincial of the Hungarian Province of the Verbites from February 2004 to May 2007. During that time he dealt successfully with health problems, including "deep vein thrombosis and lung disease". In July 2006 he became Secretary General of the Hungarian Catholic Bishops' Conference (HCBC) and taught missiology at the Sapientia College of Theology for Religious Orders in Budapest. As secretary of the HCBC, he defended his predecessor's description of the Hungarian government's repression of demonstrators marking the anniversary of the 1956 Hungarian Revolution in the fall of 2006 as "police terror and nihilism". (Note: His predecessor was András Veres, who was named Bishop of Szombathely in June 2006.) He said it was reminiscent of what he witnessed as a student in Poland, when the Jaruzelski government crushed Solidarity and declared a state of emergency. He said he feared the neoliberal market economy ideology was "now beginning to threaten our country". During his years in Hungary, he worked as a pastor and celebrated Mass in the Croatian language for members of the Balkan diaspora. In addition to Hungarian and Serbian, he speaks English, German, Polish, Italian and Croatian.

=== Bishop ===
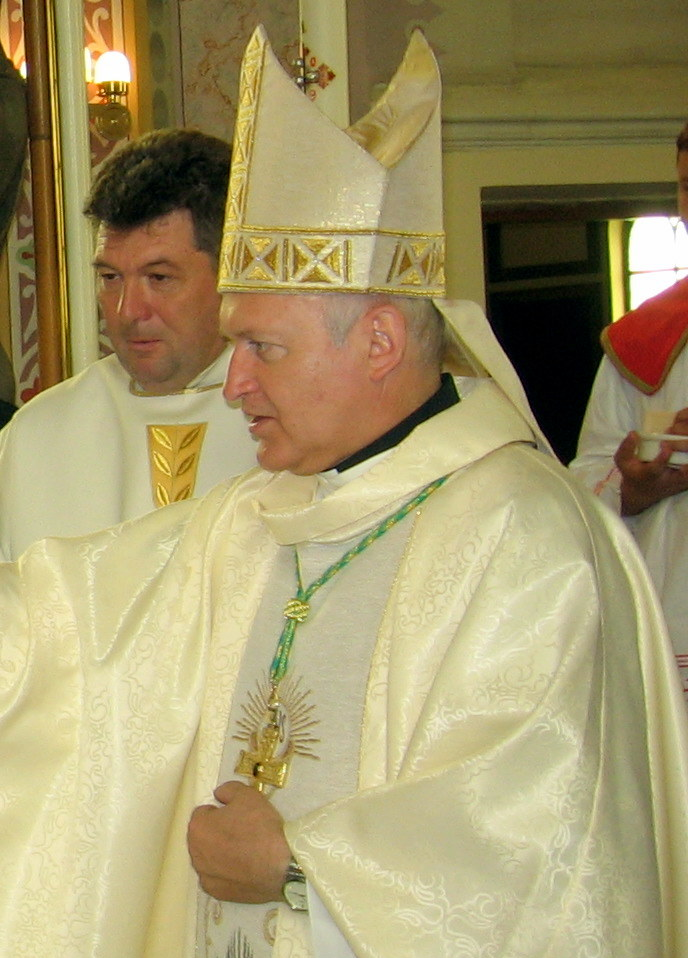
Német as bishop in 2009

On 23 April 2008, Pope Benedict XVI named him bishop of Zrenjanin in Serbia. (Note: The Diocese was erected in 1986 and Nemet became its third bishop. He later noted that his appointment was unusual in that members of his order rarely become bishops. As of December 2022 he was one of only two Verbite bishops in Europe.) He received his episcopal consecration on 5 July 2008 from Cardinal Péter Erdő, Archbishop of Budapest, with Archbishop Juliusz Janusz, Apostolic Nuncio to Hungary, and Bishop László Huzsvár, his predecessor in Zrenjanin, as co-consecrators. The service was conducted principally in Hungarian; the other languages used were Bulgarian, Croatian, German, and Latin. Though this meant returning to the region of his birth in Serbia, he said he felt no attachment to it after 33 years away and could happily work anywhere.

Nemet's diocese had an aging population that was also declining through emigration. He organized the scattered Catholics into a reduced number of parishes with elected parish councils. By 2017 they were staffed by 24 priests who offered Mass in 72 places. Still, confirmations fell from 320 in 2009 to 230 in 2017, when the ratio of baptisms to funerals reached 9 to 14. Nemet focused on multiplying parish activities, guaranteeing that small communities were included, and making personal interaction a priority. He said: "I think it is important for people to feel that they are not living their lives behind God's back." His assessment after almost ten years was that cooperation between clergy and laity remained weak, some clergy continued "feudal patterns", and the laity, still "almost invisible", needed to have their role strengthened. He also organized a diocesan synod between 2017 and 2021, well before Pope Francis—Nemet later pointed out—undertook his program for synods throughout the Church.

In April 2011, he was elected to a five-year term as secretary general of the International Episcopal Conference of Saints Cyril and Methodius (CEICEM), which comprises Kosovo, North Macedonia, Montenegro, and Serbia. In that capacity he participated in his first Vatican synod, the Synod on the New Evangelization, in October 2012, where he was chosen relator of the German-language working group.

He represented CEICEM at the second year of the Synod of Bishops on the Family in October 2015. (Note: Nemet only learned he was a delegate in July 2015, apparently as a late substitution for CEICEM president Archbishop Zef Gashi, who had attended the 2014 Synod. Gashi turned 75 in December 2013.) He thought it important that the Synod discussed the increasing challenges of interfaith marriage, cultures where trial marriages and polygamy were the norm, the legal recognition granted to partnerships the Church does not consider marriage, and the challenges of widowhood and single parenting. He welcomed a new emphasis on human relationships that might allow some living outside the Church's norms to participate in the life of the Church, and the focus on the longevity of relationships, which is critical for children, despite the pressures of economic dislocation and relocation. He praised efforts to protect women from abuse and to value their social role, while objecting to the promotion of same-sex parenting and denying children recognition as boys and girls.

He was elected to a five-year term as president of CEICEM in 2016 and re-elected in 2021.

In December 2018, Nemet issued a letter about couples living in "unregulated relationships", that is, without the benefit of sacramental marriage. After explaining the origins of marriage and its role in childbearing and instruction in the faith, he affirmed God's love for families "in every wounded situation". He continued: "There are also our fellow human beings who do not consider sacramental marriage important, but who live together and live together as a family in a social sense. We ask them to try to discover the greatness and beauty of sacramental marriage, with all its joy, and to live this opportunity of God's love." Considering those who are divorced and remarried, whose lives are "marked by wounds, fractures and the courageous commitment to a new beginning", he quoted Pope Francis' Amoris laetitia: "God's grace is at work in their lives, giving them the courage to do good, to care for one another with love, and to be at the service of the community in which they live and work." He concluded by urging such couples to have the courage to consult a pastor about access to Communion, permitted in "special cases, under strict conditions". (Note: The requirements to be met at the outset, he wrote, were "that the couples have been living together for a long time, leading an exemplary life, and that faith and ecclesial community life are important to them".)

Throughout the winter of 2019/20 he sought medical attention for help with "burnout and depression". He said the experience left him less focused on perfectionism and more frank in conversation, to the astonishment of his priests.

He was elected to a five-year term as one of two vice-presidents of the Council of the Bishops' Conferences of Europe (CCEE) on 25 September 2021. He said the CCEE's "greatest challenge" was "to give Europe a new spirituality, a new soul".

=== Archbishop and cardinal ===
On 5 November 2022, Pope Francis appointed him Archbishop of Belgrade. He was installed there on 10 December. In addition to Catholic prelates from several Eastern European countries, the head of the Serbian Orthodox Church Patriarch Porfirije attended. He continued as apostolic administrator of Zrenjanin until the installation of his successor.

Nemet described the significance of his appointment in terms of Belgrade's political and ethnic history, in that "after 104 years in this building where the archbishop of Belgrade resides, which was previously the embassy of the Austro-Hungarian Empire, a Hungarian will once again live". As he took up his post in Belgrade he assessed the ethnic-religious issues he faced. He dismissed the longstanding dispute between the Catholic Church in Croatia and the Orthodox Church in Serbia as "their problem, not our problem". He said Serbian Catholicism, composed of 70% Hungarian speakers and 30% Slavs of many nations, needed to assert its own identity and discover its potential. He pointed out that the young Roman Catholics of Serbia spoke Serbian and found reliance on liturgical texts in Croatian or Hungarian alienating.

Assessing a pan-European synod organized by the CCEE in February 2023, he praised the Germans for their theological tradition and international mission work, declining to criticize their approach to synodality. He noted that their concerns were widely shared, if differently expressed, by other national synods, including those of eastern Europe, which underscored "the tension between pastoral care and teaching" with respect to the status of women in the Church and exclusions based on sexual orientation. He said: "We need to see the suffering person behind every path of life and how much suffering we ourselves cause to people when we hate." Asked specifically about the LGBT community, he said: "I do not understand what we lose if we finally begin to experience without fear the infinite and overflowing, unimaginable love of God for each person." He added that gender theory "is based on real scientific results", it is "now a generally accepted medical fact that not all people are born male or female", that some experience "emotional or hormonal states that differ from the physiological reality that characterizes women and men", and that "these people are children of God just like you or me".

As president of CEICEM he participated as a delegate in the Synod of Bishops on Synodality in 2023 and 2024.

He assessed the Synod's work enthusiastically for including lay men and women, and he cited its lessons in dialogue and listening, for demonstrating the need for transparency and accountability on the part of bishops. He interpreted its work on the role of women in the Church as making concrete how decentralization will allow "each local church will look at its situation, its culture and its needs, where more can be given to women", even as "different forms of expression" are governed by Rome, which ensures "the principle of unity. He cited the permanent diaconate and "blessings for couples in same-sex relationships" as models, implemented to varying degrees across the Catholic world.

When the Vatican offered guidance in December 2023 that allowed for priests to bless same-sex couples, and the reaction from eastern European prelates was largely negative, Nemet endorsed the initiative. He said there could be no blessing of a same-sex union itself, but that a same-sex couple requesting a blessing meant the world was "discovering truths ... faster than we do on the basis of biblical revelation and tradition".

On 6 October 2024, Pope Francis announced that he planned to make Nemet a cardinal on 8 December, a date that was later changed to 7 December. He is the first person from Serbia to be named to the College of Cardinals. (Note: He may also be the first cardinal from a country with an Orthodox Christian majority.) He said he thought Pope Francis chose him for his commitment to the synodal process, noting that he had held a diocesan synod in Zrenjanin "before Covid...even before the Pope started the synodal renewal of the universal church". He also recognized that there would be political reactions to his appointment in the Serbian and Croatian press, both favorable and critical. (Note: One Croatian newspaper thought it inappropriate that Nemet was made a cardinal ahead of the archbishop of Zagreb, the traditional representative of the Balkans in the College of Cardinals, although the Archbishop emeritus of Zagreb Josip Bozanić is a cardinal and remains eligible to vote in a papal conclave until March 2029.) Others tried to read the choice of Nemet as part of a Vatican strategy with respect to the much contested question of canonizing Aloysius Stepinac, Archbishop of Zagreb from 1937 to 1960. Nemet's responded that similar nationalist reactions in both Croatia and Serbia did "not correspond at all to the Catholic consciousness", that Francis aimed simply to strengthen the Church in Serbia.

On 7 December 2024, Pope Francis made him a cardinal, assigning him as a member of the order of cardinal priests the title of Santa Maria Stella Maris in Ostia.

On 11 January 2025, he was named a member of the Dicastery for Promoting Christian Unity.

He participated as a cardinal elector in the 2025 papal conclave that elected Pope Leo XIV.

== See also ==
- Catholic Church in Serbia
- Cardinals created by Pope Francis
