= Roman Catholic Diocese of Zrenjanin =

Roman Catholic diocese in Serbia

Diocese of Zrenjanin Dioecesis Zrenianensis Nagybecskereki egyházmegye Зрењанинска бискупија

Catholic
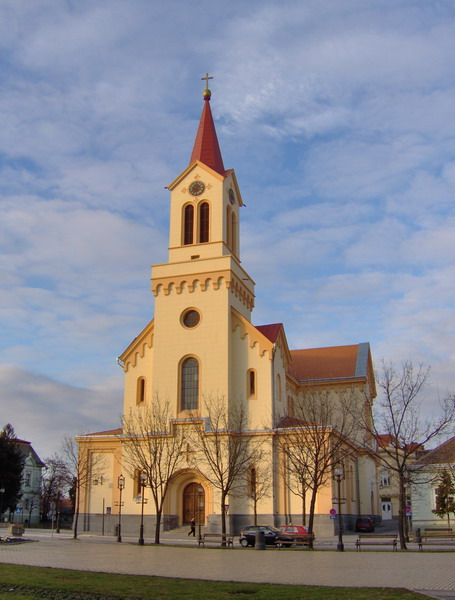
- Cathedral of St. John of Nepomuk, Zrenjanin

Location
- Country: Serbia
- Ecclesiastical province: Belgrade
- Metropolitan: Archdiocese of Belgrade

Statistics
- Area: 9,387 km^{2} (3,624 sq mi)
- Population: Total; Catholics: (as of 2022); ▼484,464; ▼64,110 (▼7.7%)

Information
- Denomination: Catholic
- Sui iuris church: Latin Church
- Rite: Roman Rite
- Established: 1923 (Apostolic Administration of Banat); 1986 (Diocese of Zrenjanin)
- Cathedral: Cathedral of St. John of Nepomuk, Zrenjanin

Current leadership
- Pope: Leo XIV
- Bishop elect: Mirko Štefković
- Metropolitan Archbishop: Ladislav Nemet
- Vicar General: József Mellár

Map
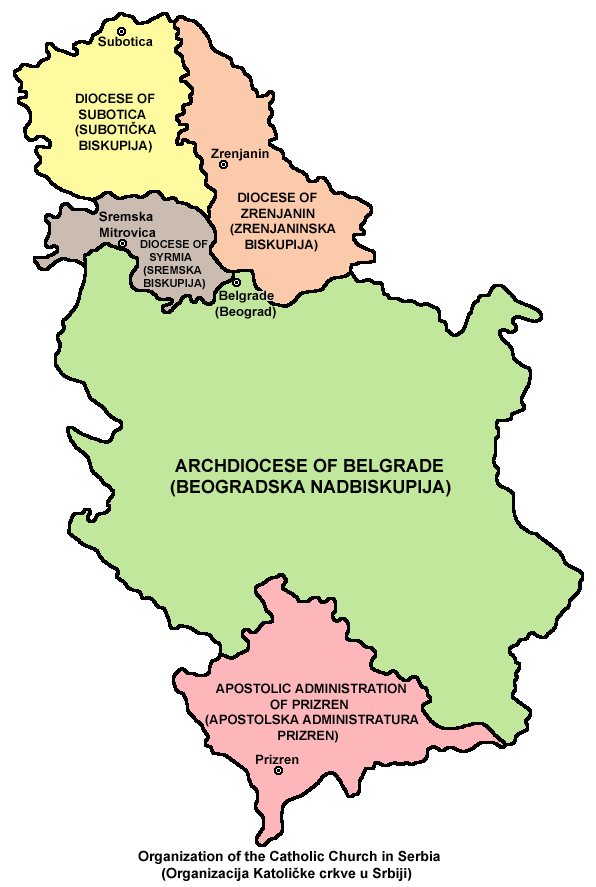

Website
- catholic-zr.org.rs

The Diocese of Zrenjanin (Latin: Dioecesis Zrenjanensis; Hungarian: Nagybecskereki egyházmegye; Serbian: Зрењанинска бискупија) is a Latin diocese of the Catholic Church in Serbia, covering Serbian part of the Banat region. It is a suffragan diocese in the ecclesiastical province of the Archdiocese of Belgrade. The episcopal see is located at the Cathedral of St. John of Nepomuk in Zrenjanin.

== History ==
Until the end of World War I, the territory of the present-day Diocese of Zrenjanin belonged to the Diocese of Csanád. After the collapse of Austria-Hungary, region of Western Banat was incorporated into newly formed Kingdom of Serbs, Croats, and Slovenes (later known as Yugoslavia). In 1923, the Apostolic Administration of Yugoslav Banat was created. First apostolic administrator was Ivan Rafael Rodić. In 1924, he was appointed first Catholic Archbishop of Belgrade, continuing to serve also as apostolic administrator of Yugoslav Banat. Until the end of World War II, the largest number of Catholics in the territory of Yugoslav Banat was of German ethnicity. In 1986, apostolic administration was reorganized into "Diocese of Zrenjanin" and placed under metropolitan jurisdiction of Archdiocese of Belgrade.

== List of administrators and bishops ==
Administrators

- Ivan Rafael Rodić (19 February 1923 – 28 November 1936)
- Josip Ujčić (28 November 1936 – 24 March 1964)
- Gabrijel Bukatko (24 March 1964 – 22 December 1971)
- Tamás Jung (22 December 1971 – 16 December 1986)

Bishops

- Tamás Jung (16 December 1986 – 7 January 1988)
- László Huzsvár (7 January 1988 – 30 June 2007)
- Ladislav Nemet (23 April 2008 – 5 November 2022)
- Mirko Štefković (18 March 2024 – present)

== Gallery ==
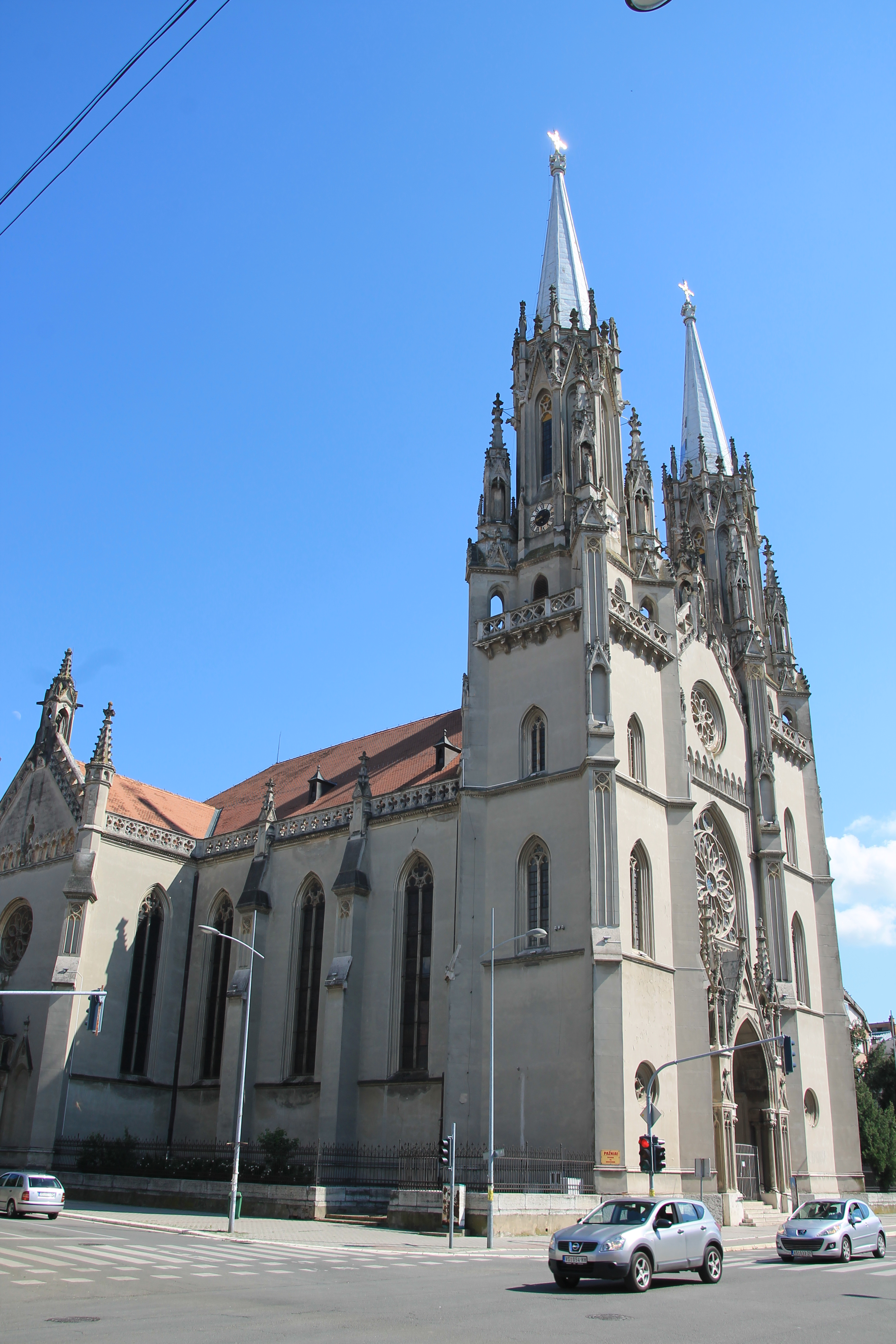
Church of Saint Gerhard de Sangredo in Vršac

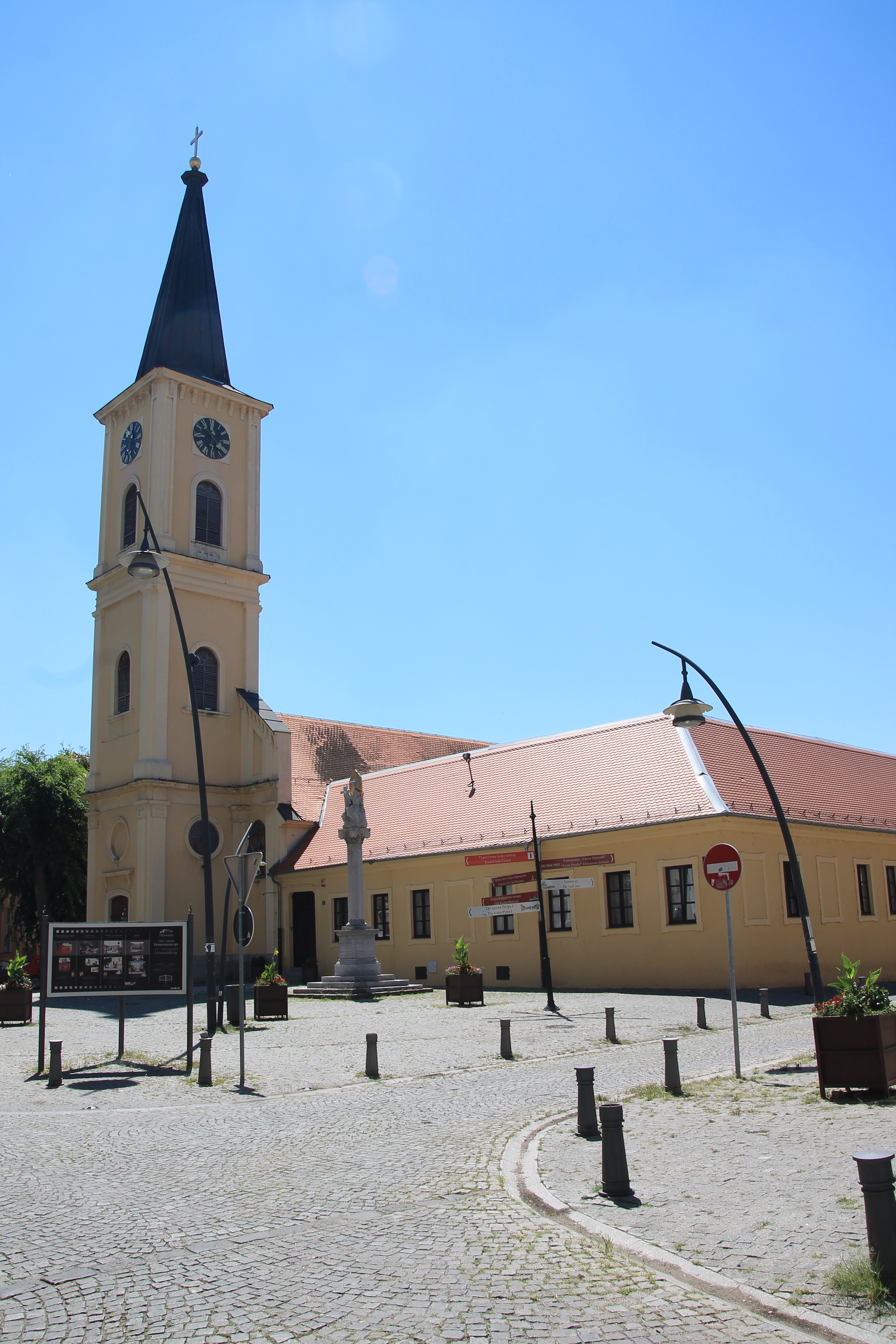
Church of St. Charles Borromeo in Pančevo

== See also ==
- Catholic Church in Serbia
- List of Catholic dioceses in Serbia
