= Church of Saint Gerhard de Sangredo, Vršac =

Church in Vršac, Serbia

Church of Saint Gerhard de Sangredo
- Црква Светог Герхарда де Сангредо; Crkva Svetog Gerharda de Sangredo
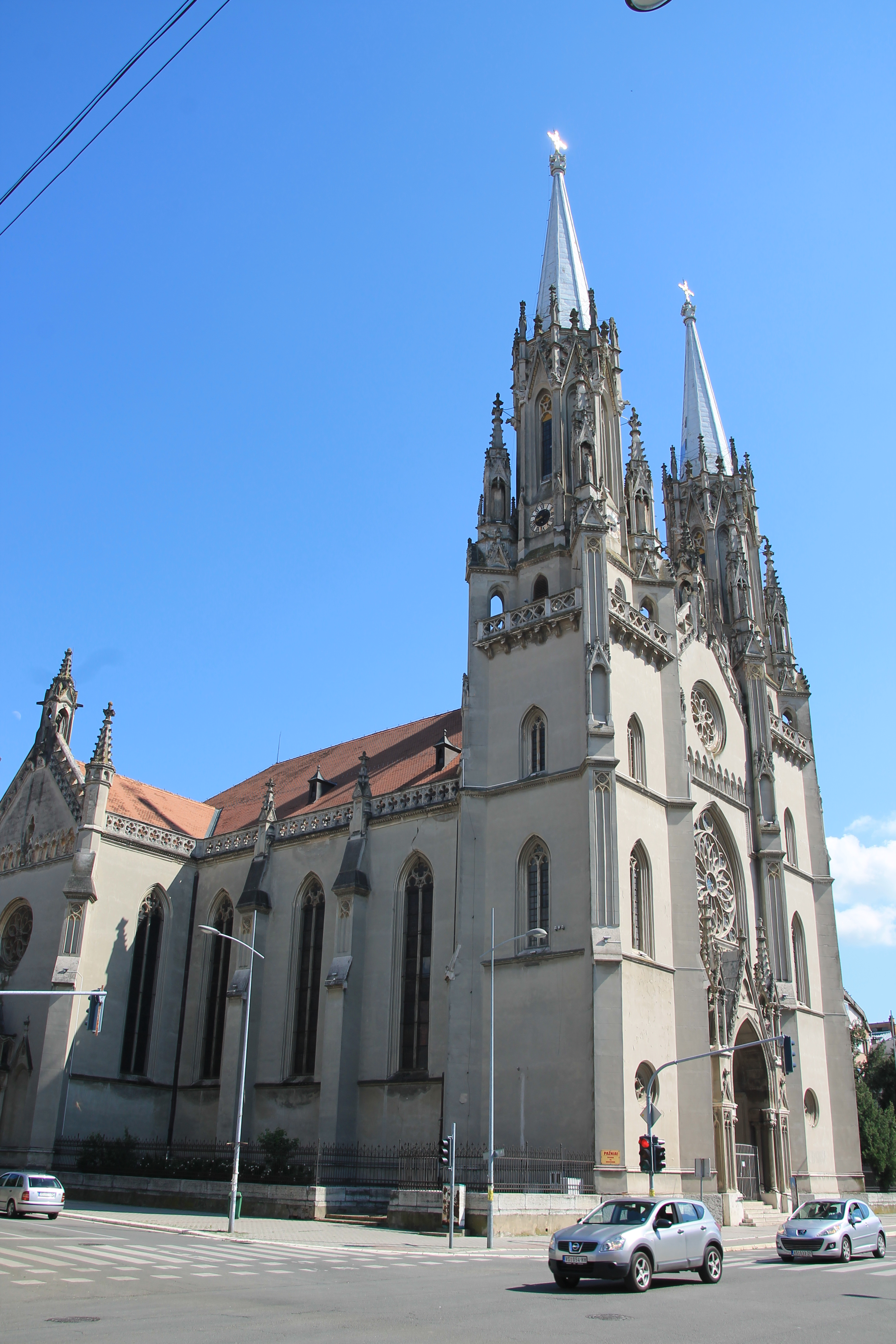
- Church of Saint Gerhard de Sangredo, pictured in 2020
- Church of Saint Gerhard de Sangredo
- 45°07′05″N 21°18′06″E
- Location: Vršac
- Country: Serbia
- Denomination: Roman Catholic Church

History
- Dedication: Gerard of Csanád

Architecture
- Style: Gothic Revival
- Years built: 1860-1863

Administration
- Archdiocese: Diocese of Zrenjanin

The Church of Saint Gerhard de Sangredo (Serbian: Црква Светог Герхарда де Сангредо, romanized: Crkva svetog Gerharda de Sangredo) is the Roman Catholic church in Vršac, Serbia. It is the largest Catholic church in the country.

== History ==
German families were the first Catholics to settle in Vršac in 1717 after the end of Austro-Turkish War and reorganization of the region from Temeşvar Eyalet into Banat of Temeswar. The parish was founded in 1720. In the absence of a church, a former mosque was used for religious services. The first church was constructed in 1730, with the tower added between 1750 and 1751. A new Neo-Gothic church was built between 1860 and 1863 and was consecrated on 27 December 1863.

== Gallery ==
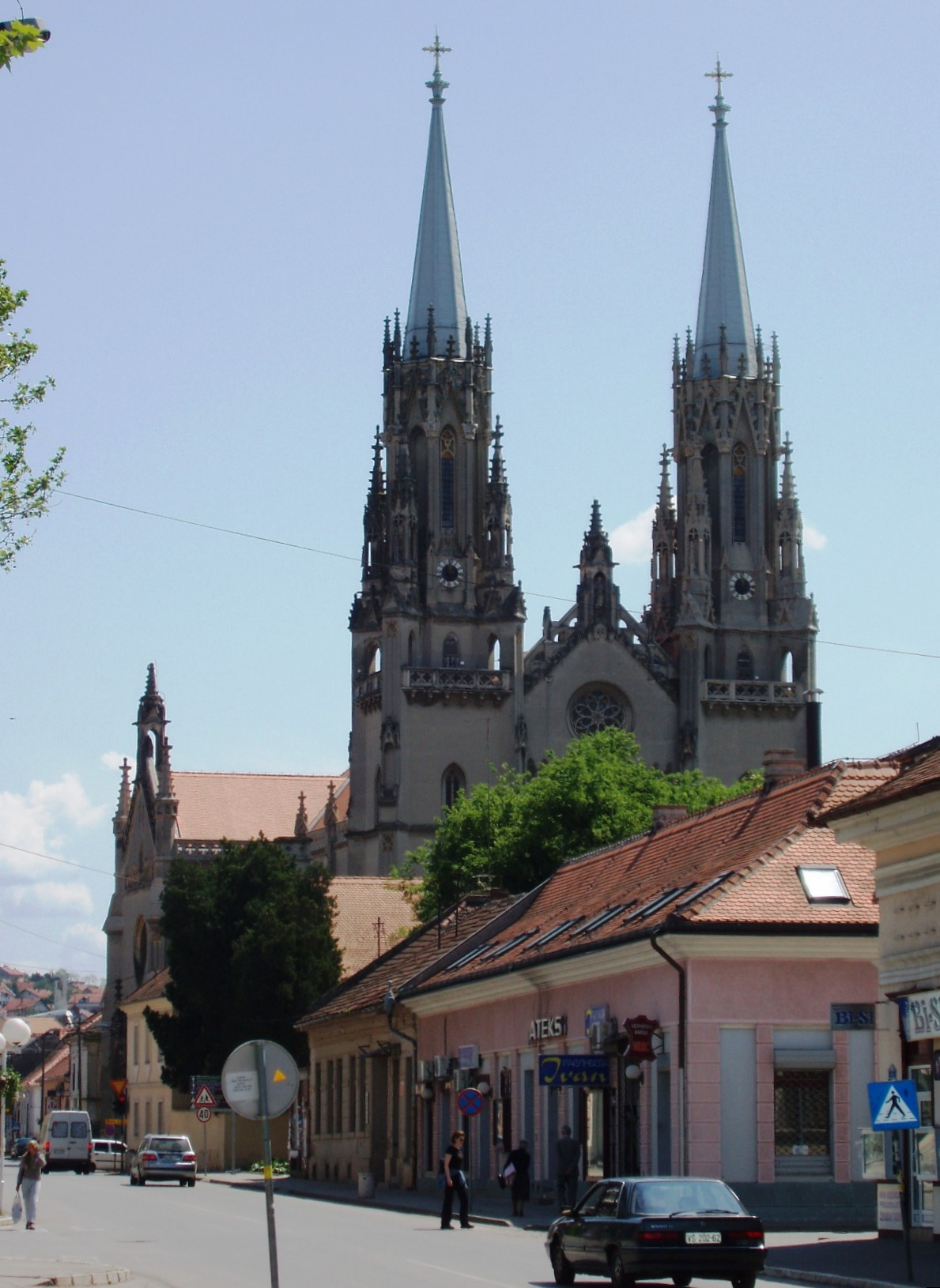

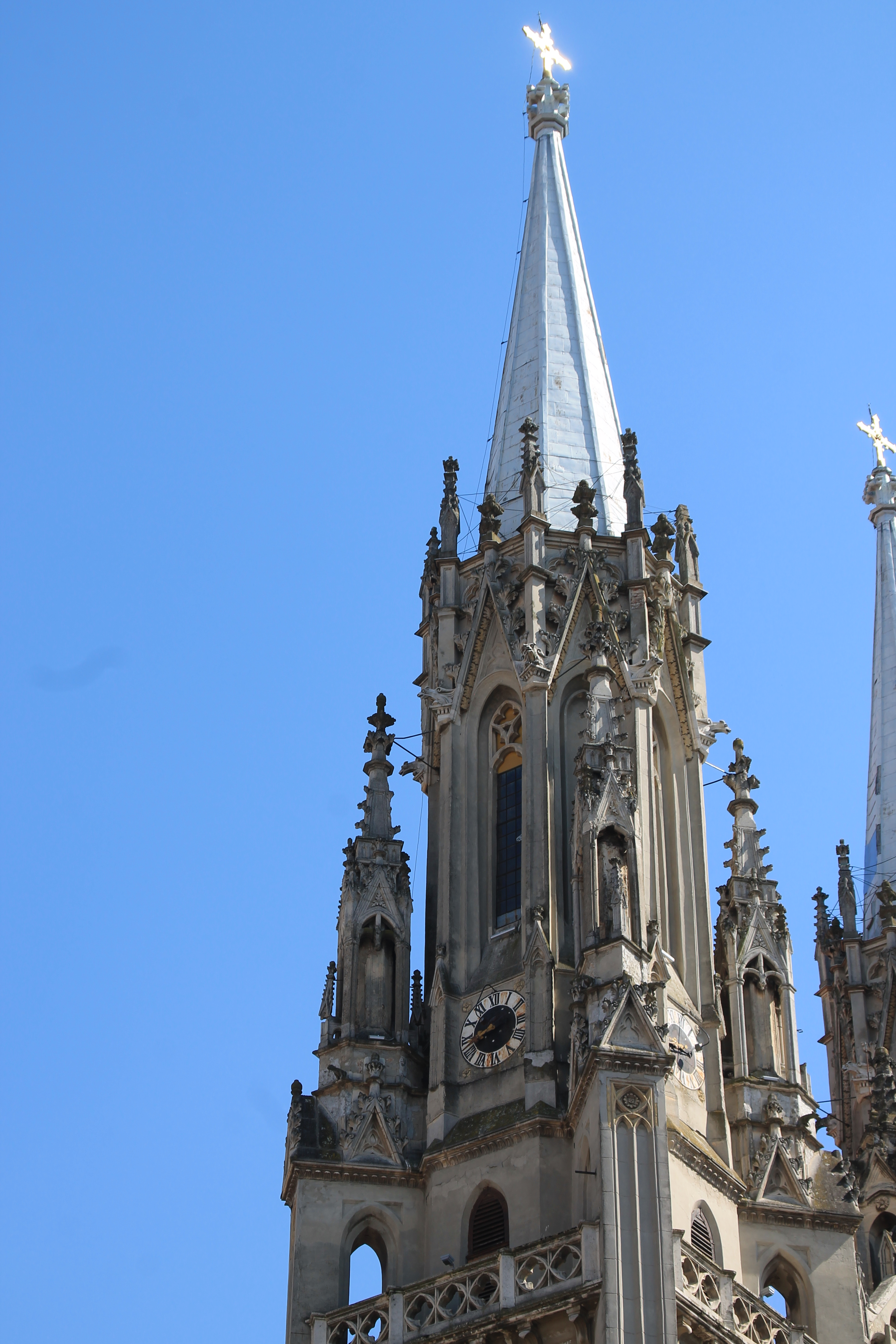

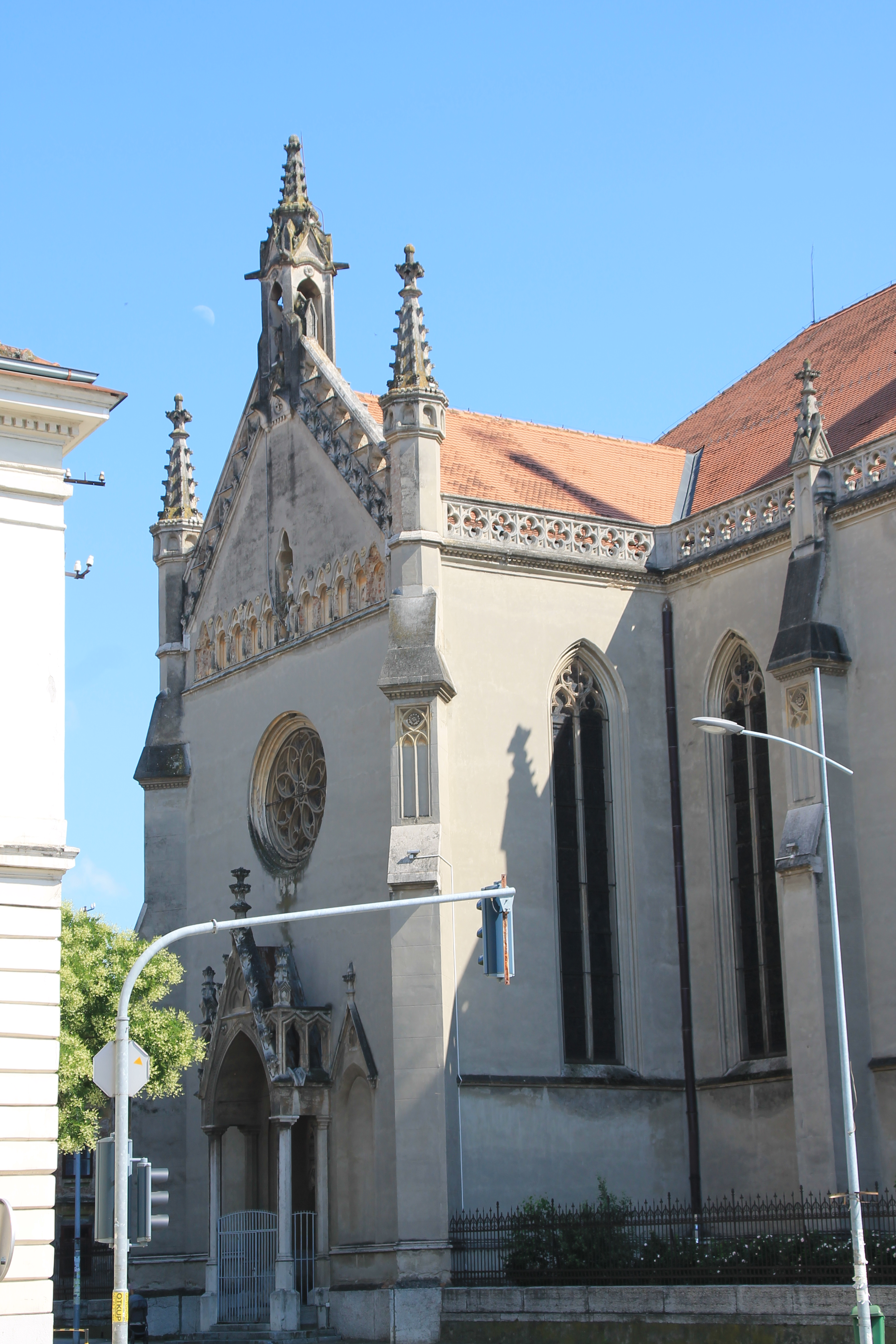

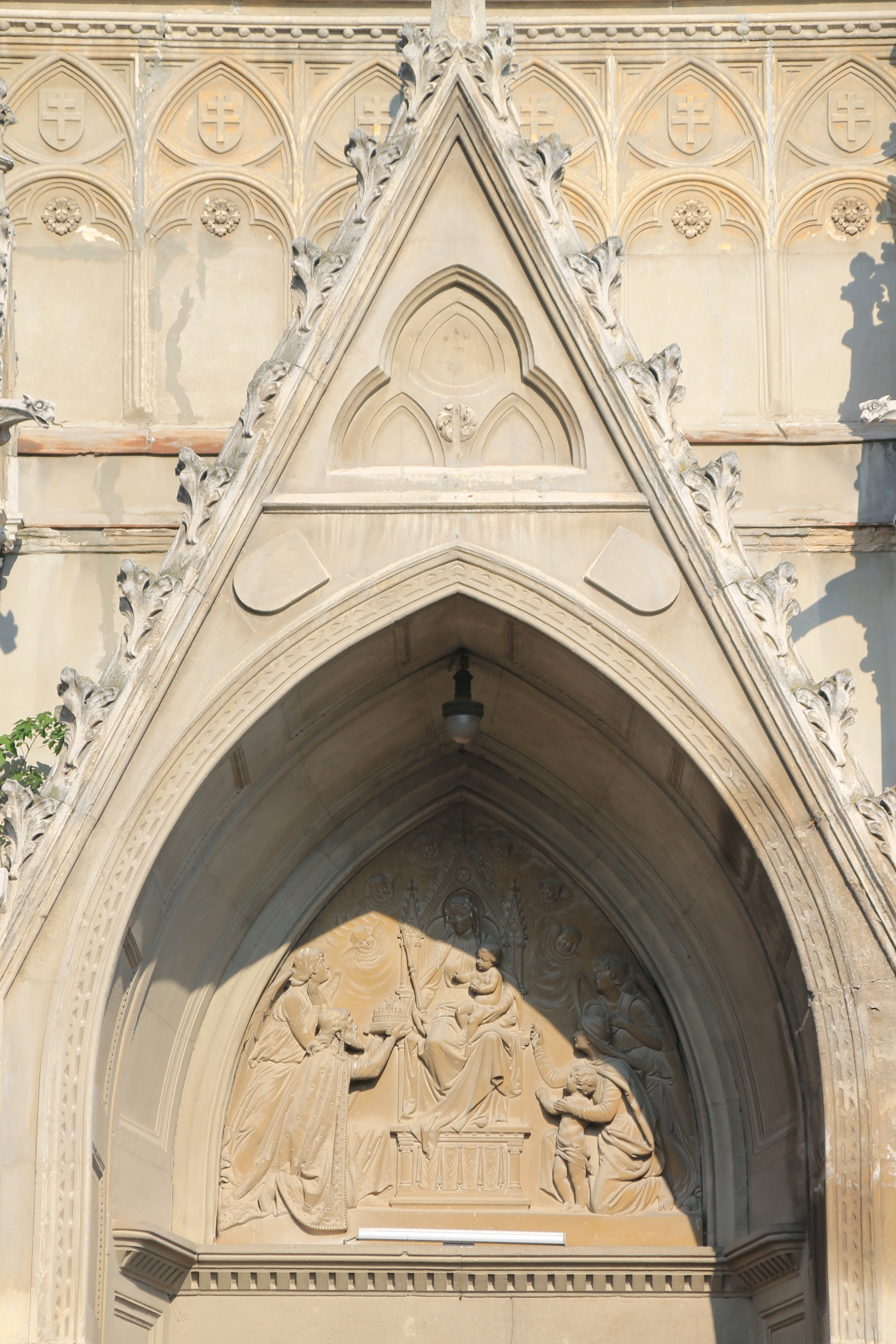

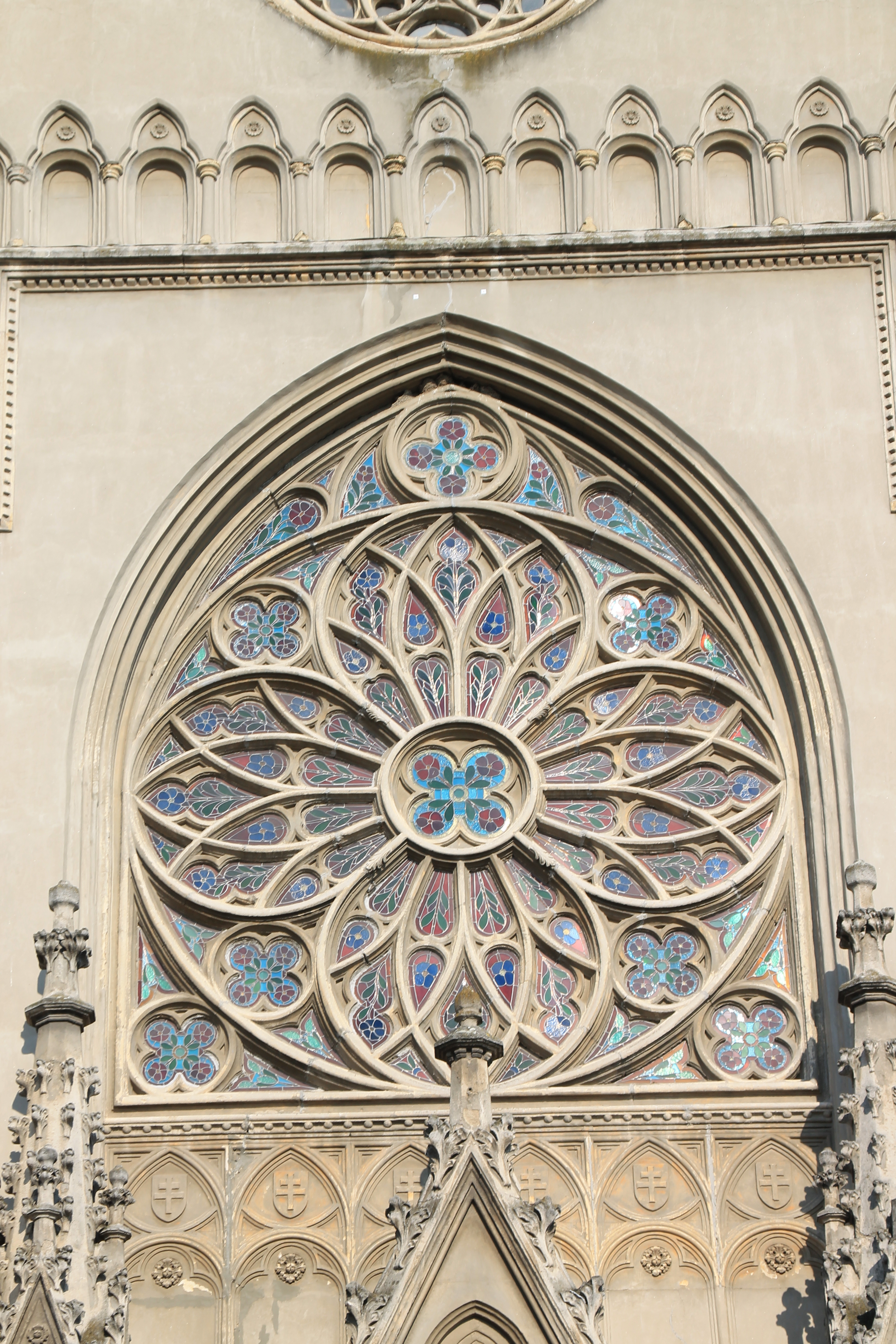

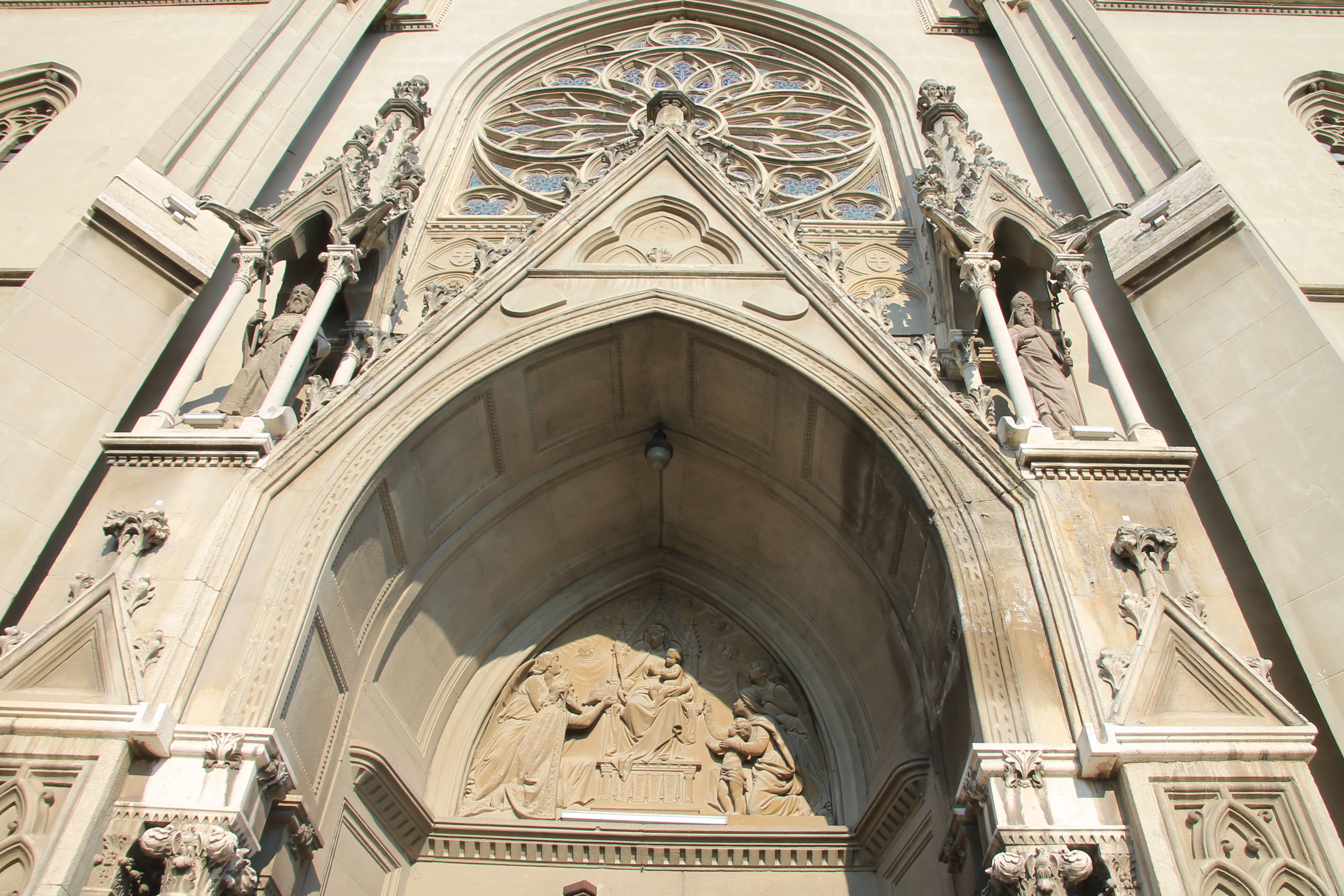

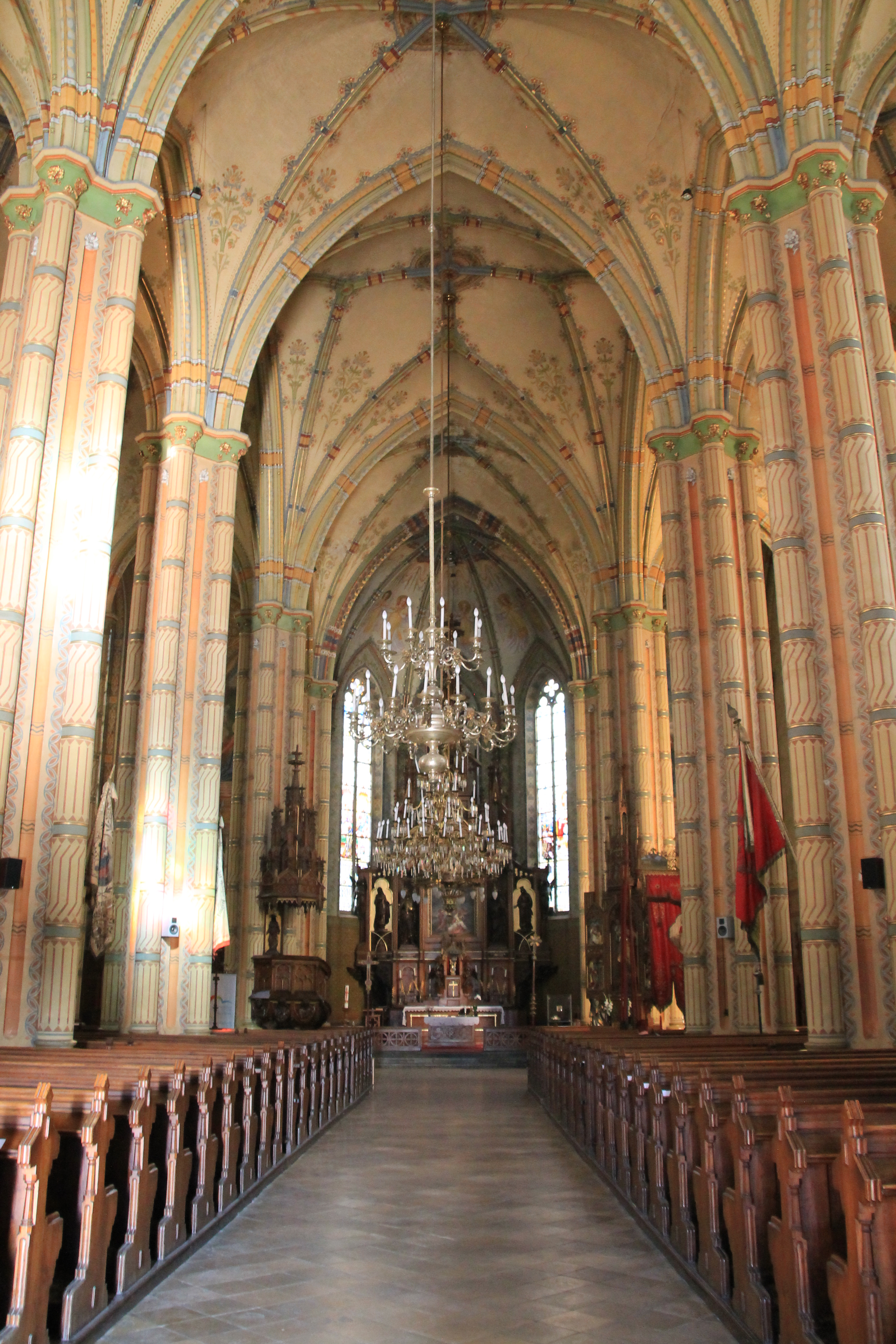

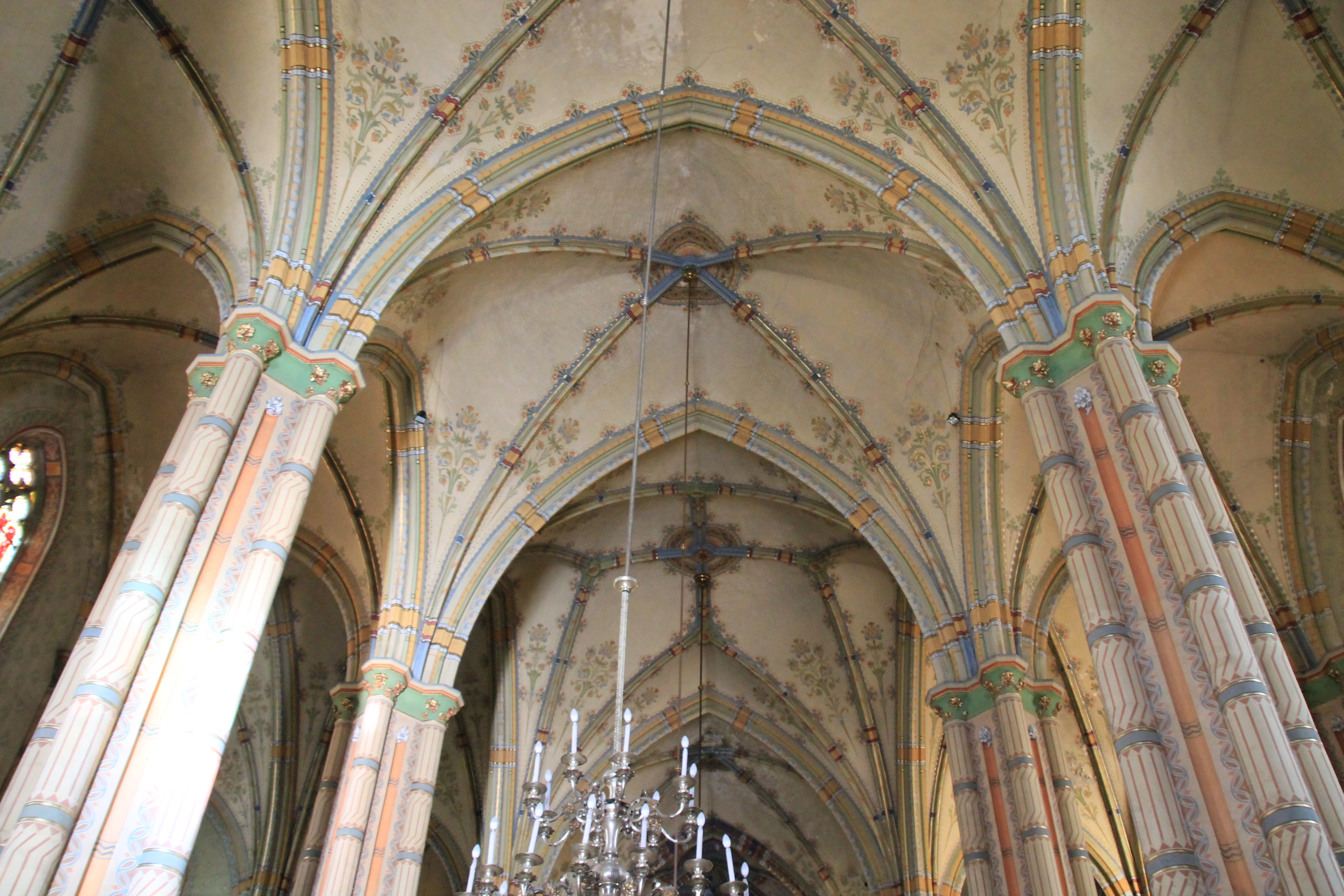

== See also ==
- Catholic Church in Serbia
- Saint Nicholas Cathedral
- Cathedral of Ascension of the Ascension of the Lord
