= Mirko Štefković =

Serbian Roman Catholic bishop (born 1977)

His Excellency Mirko Štefković
- Bishop of Zrenjanin
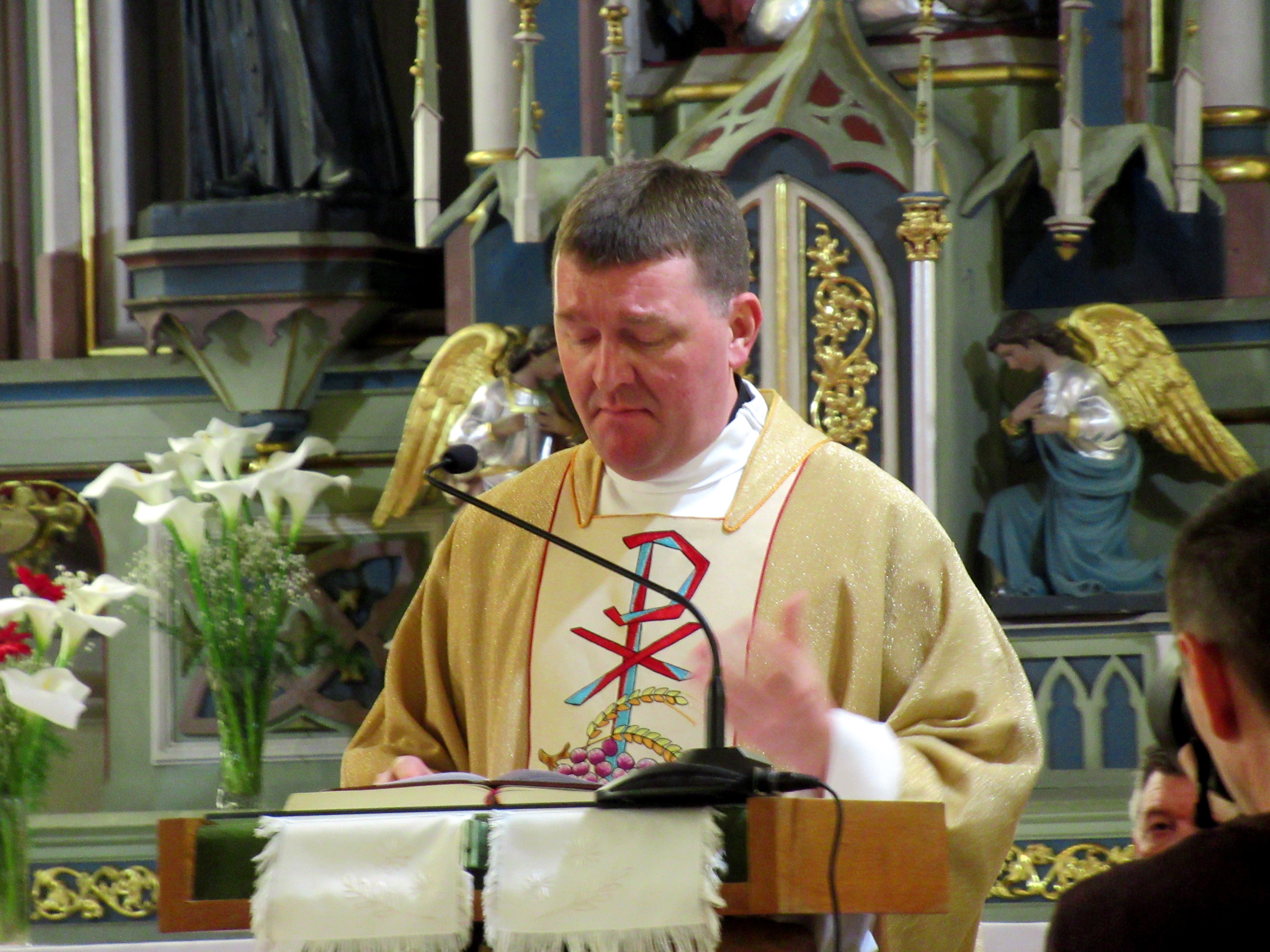
- Church: Catholic Church
- Diocese: Roman Catholic Diocese of Zrenjanin
- Appointed: 18 March 2024

Orders
- Ordination: 29 June 2004
- Consecration: 1 June 2024

Personal details
- Born: 24 September 1977 (age 49) Subotica, SFR Yugoslavia (now Serbia)
- Denomination: Roman Catholic
- Education: Pontifical Urban University, Pontifical Gregorian University
- Coat of arms

Mirko Štefković (Serbian Cyrillic: Мирко Штефковић; born 24 September 1977) is a Serbian Roman Catholic prelate who has served as the Bishop of Zrenjanin since 2024.

== Early life and education ==
Štefković was born on 24 September 1977 in Subotica, then part of Yugoslavia. He attended the diocesan classical gymnasium Paulinum in Subotica. After completing compulsory military service in Niš, he was sent to Rome for priestly formation.

He studied philosophy at the Pontifical Urban University from 1998 to 2000 and theology at the Pontifical Gregorian University, earning a licentiate in fundamental theology in 2006.

== Priesthood ==
Štefković was ordained a deacon on 3 May 2003 and a priest on 29 June 2004 for the Diocese of Subotica.

Following his ordination, he served as personal secretary to the Bishop of Subotica and later held several diocesan offices, including diocesan economist and director of the Josephinum priests’ residence. He also served as diocesan spokesperson, master of ceremonies, and general secretary of the International Bishops' Conference of Saints Cyril and Methodius.

He taught fundamental theology at the Theological-Catechetical Institute of the Diocese of Subotica.

== Episcopacy ==
On 18 March 2024, Pope Francis appointed Štefković as Bishop of Zrenjanin. He succeeded Archbishop László Német, who had served as apostolic administrator of the diocese. Štefković received episcopal consecration on 1 June 2024.

== Languages ==
Štefković speaks Croatian, Serbian, Hungarian, Italian, German, and English.
