= Metropolitanate of Belgrade (disambiguation) =

The term Metropolitanate of Belgrade may refer to:

- Metropolitanate of Belgrade, an ecclesiastical province (metropolitanate) of the Eastern Orthodox Metropolitanate of Karlovci, existed between 1718 and 1739.
- Metropolitanate of Belgrade, an Eastern Orthodox autonomous and later independent church that existed between 1831 and 1920, with jurisdiction over the territory of the Principality of Serbia and then Kingdom of Serbia.

== See also ==
- Belgrade
- Archbishop of Belgrade (disambiguation)
- Archbishopric of Belgrade (disambiguation)
- Archdiocese of Belgrade (disambiguation)
