= László Huzsvár =

László Huzsvár (21 February 1931 – 10 December 2016) was a Serbian Roman Catholic bishop.

== Biography ==
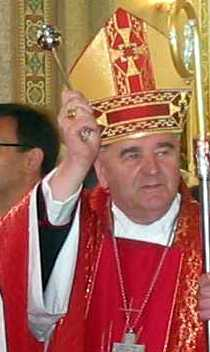

Huzsvár was born in Horgoš and was ordained to the priesthood on 29 June 1958. On 7 January 1988, he was appointed bishop of the Roman Catholic Diocese of Zrenjanin and ordained as bishop on 14 February 1988.

Pope Benedict XVI accepted his resignation on 30 June 2006.

Huzsvár died on 10 December 2016 in Subotica at the age of 85.
