= Archdiocese of Belgrade =

The term Archdiocese of Belgrade may refer to:

- Archdiocese of Belgrade and Karlovci, central diocese of the Serbian Orthodox Church.
- Archdiocese of Belgrade, central diocese of the Roman Catholic Church in Serbia.

== See also ==
- Metropolitanate of Belgrade (disambiguation)
- Eastern Orthodoxy in Serbia
- Catholic Church in Serbia
