= Catholic Church in Serbia =

- Католичка црква у Србији; Katolička crkva u Srbiji; Katolikus Egyház Szerbiában
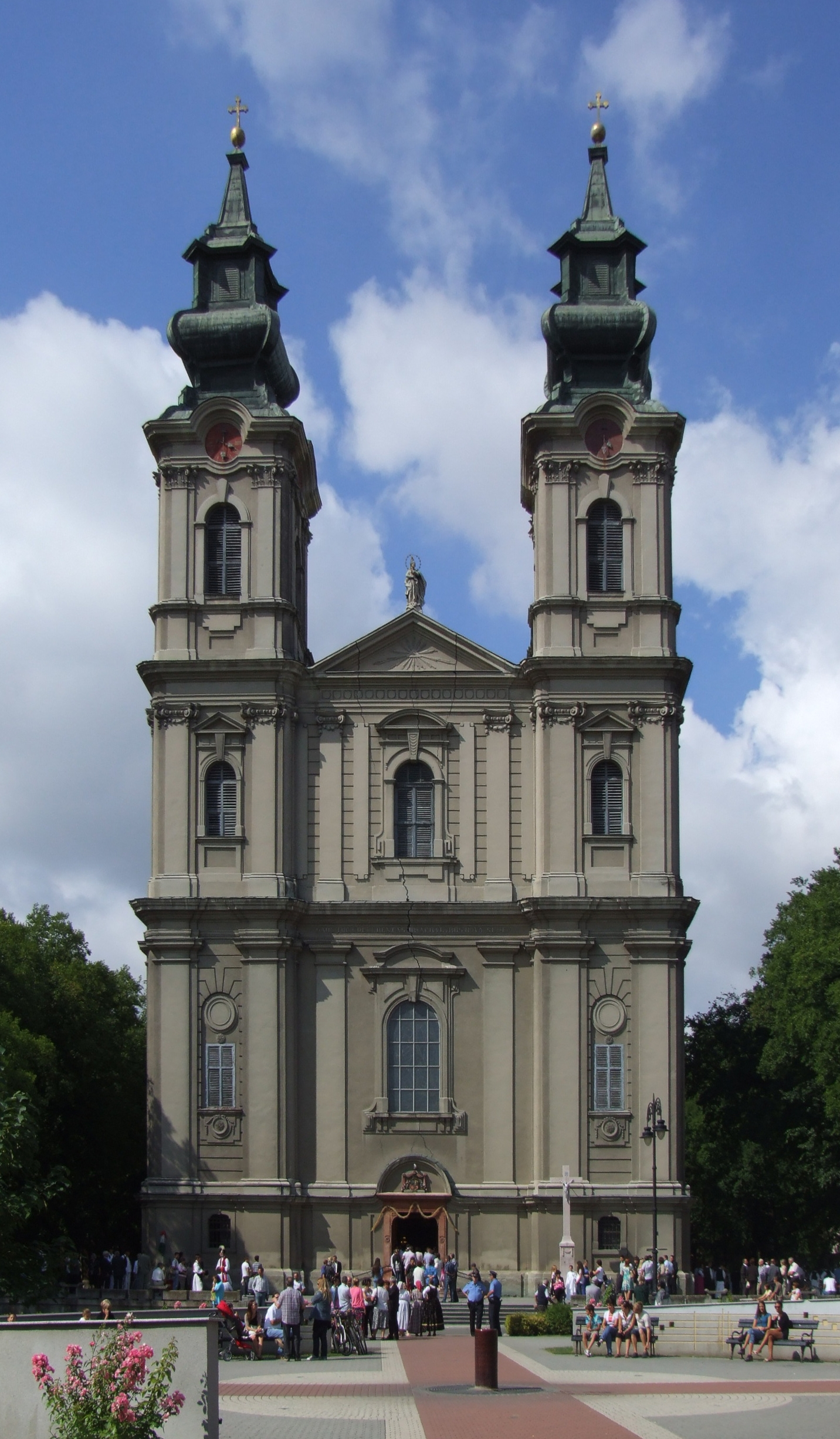
- Cathedral of St. Theresa of Avila, Subotica
- Type: National polity
- Orientation: Latin and Greek Catholic
- Governance: Episcopal
- Pope: Leo XIV
- Apostolic Nuncio: Rocco Gangemi
- President: Ladislav Nemet
- Region: Serbia
- Language: Serbian, Hungarian, Croatian, Latin
- Headquarters: Belgrade
- Members: 257,269 (2022)
- Official website: International Bishops' Conference of Saints Cyril and Methodius

The Catholic Church in Serbia (Serbian: Католичка црква у Србији; Croatian: Katolička crkva u Srbiji; Hungarian: Katolikus Egyház Szerbiában) is part of the worldwide Catholic Church under the spiritual leadership of the pope in Rome. It is the third largest religious denomination in Serbia, after Eastern Orthodoxy and Islam. According to the 2022 census, there were 257,269 Catholics in Serbia, making up 3.8% of the population.

Catholics in Serbia have historically been overwhelmingly Roman Catholic, with only a tiny fraction (around 3%) being Greek Catholic.

== History ==
By the end of the 12th century, regions of Syrmia and Mačva came under the direct rule of the Kingdom of Hungary, and during the first half of the 13th century, the Diocese of Syrmia was established for Catholics in those regions. At the same time, jurisdiction over Catholic communities in medieval Serbia (a predominantly Eastern Orthodox country), was exercised by the Diocese of Kotor and the Archdiocese of Bar, whose prelates took the title Primate of Serbia (Latin: Primas Serviae). By the 15th century, some attempts were made to establish a Roman Catholic diocese for the regions of Belgrade and Smederevo in the Serbian Despotate. Attempts of missionary John of Capistrano to convert Serbian ruler Đurađ Branković (1427-1456) from Eastern Orthodoxy to Catholicism failed. All of those territories gradually fell under Ottoman rule (1459-1521), and the care of local Catholics came under jurisdiction of the Franciscan Province of Bosnia.

In 1717, the Habsburg monarchy captured Belgrade from the Ottomans, and the Treaty of Passarowitz was concluded in 1718, officially assigning Belgrade with much of central Serbia to the Habsburgs. Since local Serb population was Eastern Orthodox, Habsburg authorities pursued complex religious policies towards various Christian communities, by recognizing the Serbian Orthodox Metropolitanate of Belgrade and also establishing the Catholic Diocese of Belgrade. After the loss of Belgrade to the Ottomans in 1739, many of local Catholics left the region, and the Diocese was returned to the state of apostolic administration, that would continue up to the beginning of the 20th century.

The first official Concordat between the Kingdom of Serbia and the Holy See was concluded on 24 June 1914. Through the Second Article of Concordat, it was decided that the Archdiocese of Belgrade should be established. Due to the outbreak of the World War I, those provisions could not be implemented, and only after the war new arrangements were made.

In 1918, Serbia became part of the newly formed Kingdom of Yugoslavia. By 1924, the Archdiocese of Belgrade was officially established and the first Archbishop appointed. Negotiations on a new Concordat between the Kingdom and the Holy See were led by the Yugoslav Minister of Justice Ljudevit Auer and Cardinal Eugenio Pacelli (who later become Pope Pius XII). The Concordat was signed in 1935 but was never officially ratified because of a strong opposition by the Serbian Orthodox Church, which argued that it granted the Catholic Church privileges not enjoyed by other religious communities and threatened religious equality. Following mass protests, political pressure, and the death of Patriarch Varnava during the controversy, the government withdrew the legislation in 1937.

== Demographics ==
Catholic Church in Serbia has a strong following among ethnic Hungarians, Croats, and Bunjevci, as well as among Rusyns, who are predominantly Greek Catholic. By contrast, only a small minority of the ethnic Serbs are Catholics. The published data from the 2022 Census included a crosstab of ethnicity and religion, which showed that adherents of Catholic Church were divided between the following ethnic groups:

- 161,071 Hungarians (62.6%)
- 33,637 Croats (13%)
- 11,947 Serbs (4.6%)
- 10,016 Bunjevci (3.9%)
- 8,533 Rusyns (3.3%)
- 4,413 Roma (1.7%)
- 3,551 Yugoslavs (1.4%)
- 3,032 Slovaks (1.1%)
- 21,069 others, undeclared or unknown (8.2%)

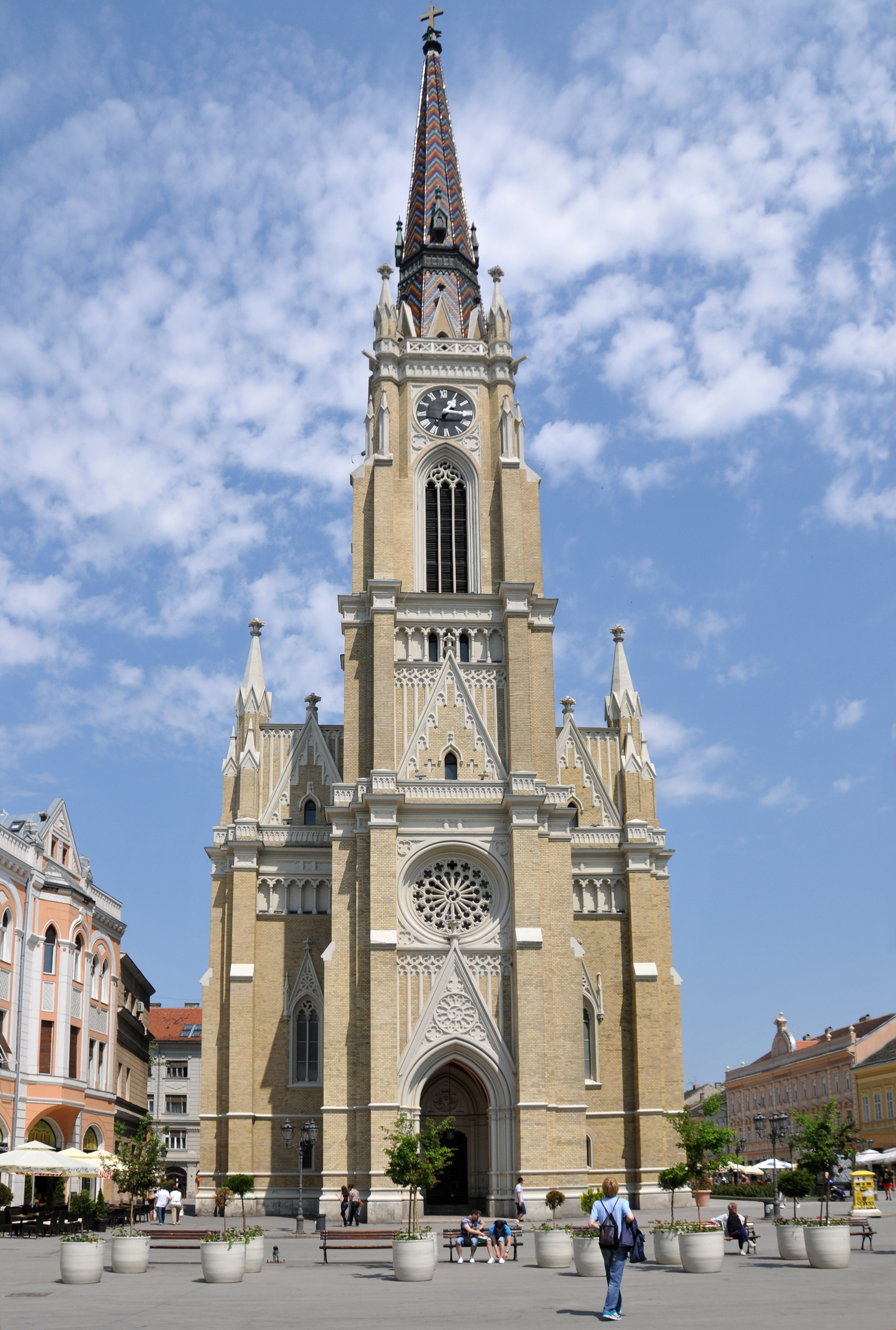
Name of Mary Church in Novi Sad

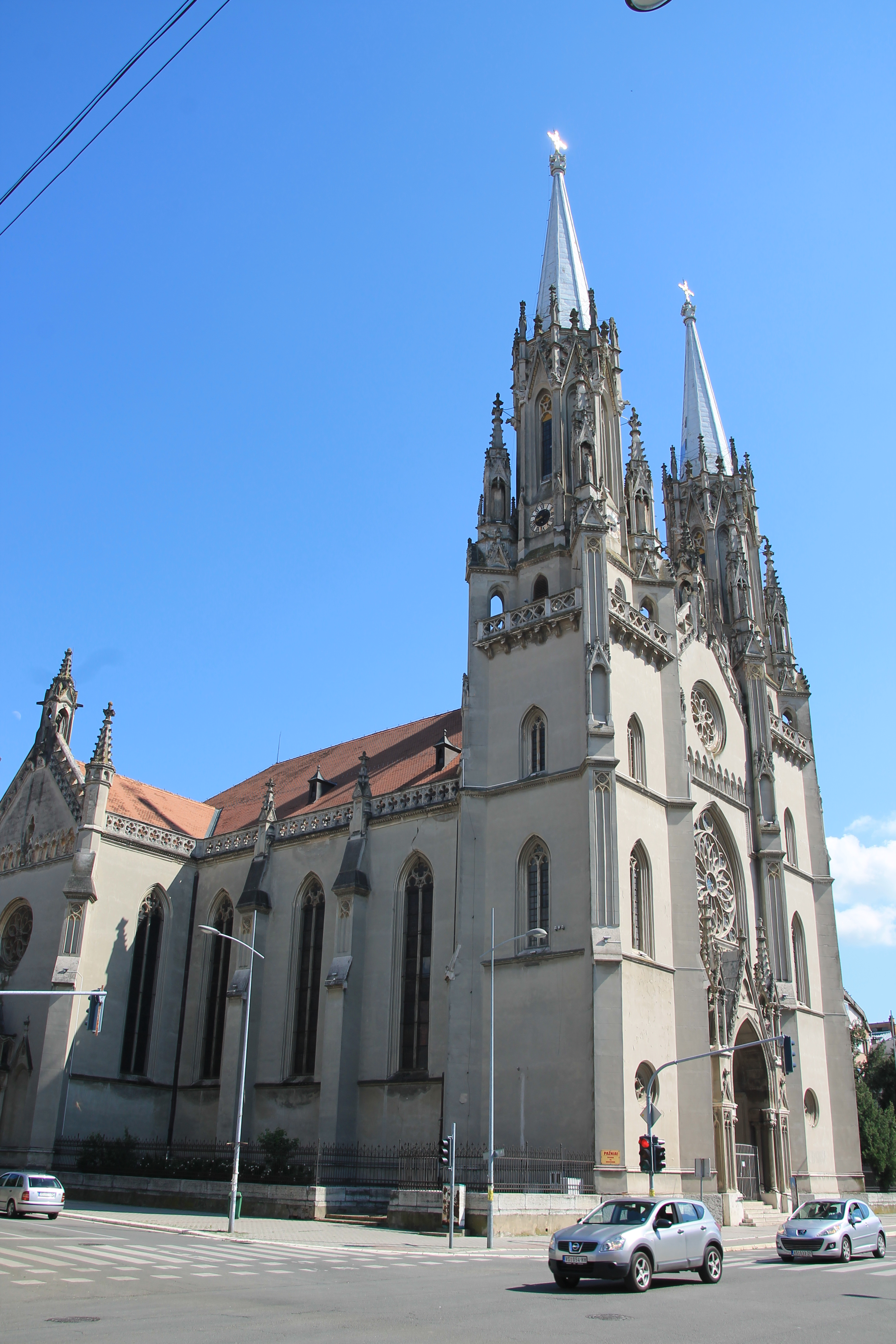
Church of Saint Gerhard de Sangredo in Vršac

The vast majority of Catholics in the country are concentrated in northern Vojvodina, with the highest proportions at the municipal level found in the municipalities of Kanjiža, Senta, and Ada, all of which have a Catholic majority. Subotica (Serbia's fifth-largest city), Bečej, Bačka Topola, and Čoka have a relative Catholic majority.

| City / municipality | Catholics | Share |
|---|---|---|
| Subotica | 59,748 | 48.2% |
| Kanjiža | 17,183 | 85.3% |
| Novi Sad | 15,822 | 4.3% |
| Sombor | 14,900 | 21% |
| Senta | 13,312 | 74.1% |
| Bečej | 12,915 | 42.1% |
| Bačka Topola | 11,719 | 44.6% |
| Ada | 9,603 | 72.2% |
| Belgrade | 9,041 | 0.5% |
| Zrenjanin | 9,039 | 8.5% |
| Kula | 6,811 | 19.1% |
| Apatin | 5,707 | 24.6% |
| Temerin | 5,658 | 21.9% |
| Kikinda | 5,394 | 10.9% |
| Vrbas | 4,772 | 13% |
| Čoka | 3,848 | 45% |
| Bač | 3,682 | 32.2% |
| Mali Iđoš | 3,552 | 35.6% |
| Novi Bečej | 3,003 | 15.1% |

== Structure ==
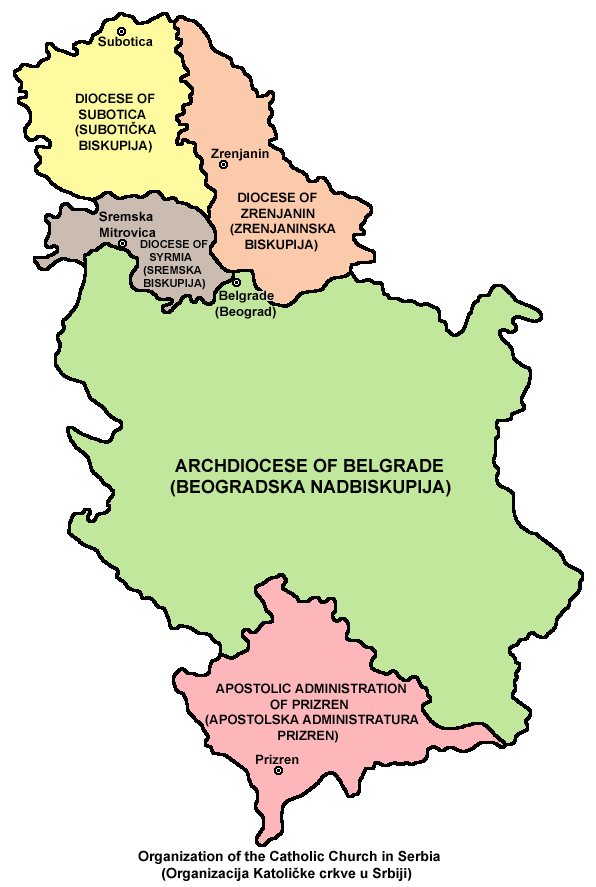
Map of Roman Catholic dioceses in Serbia

Within Serbia, the hierarchy of Latin Church consists of the metropolitan Archdiocese of Belgrade and its suffragans, the diocese of Zrenjanin and the diocese of Subotica; as well as the diocese of Srijem, which is suffragan to the Croatia-based Archdiocese of Đakovo–Osijek. The Greek Catholic Eparchy of Ruski Krstur serves the faithful of Byzantine rite.

The International Bishops' Conference of Saints Cyril and Methodius is the international episcopal conference that includes Serbia, Kosovo, Montenegro, and North Macedonia. Permanent members are the Catholic bishops and archbishops from the four countries. Beside the bishops of the Latin Church, it also includes bishops of the two eparchies for the Greek Catholics. The conference is a member of the Council of European Bishops' Conferences. As of 2026, the President of the Conference is Cardinal Ladislav Nemet, Archbishop of Belgrade.

Caritas Serbia is a Catholic social welfare and humanitarian relief organization operating all over the country.

== See also ==
- Religion in Serbia
- Christianity in Serbia
