= Hungary–Poland relations =

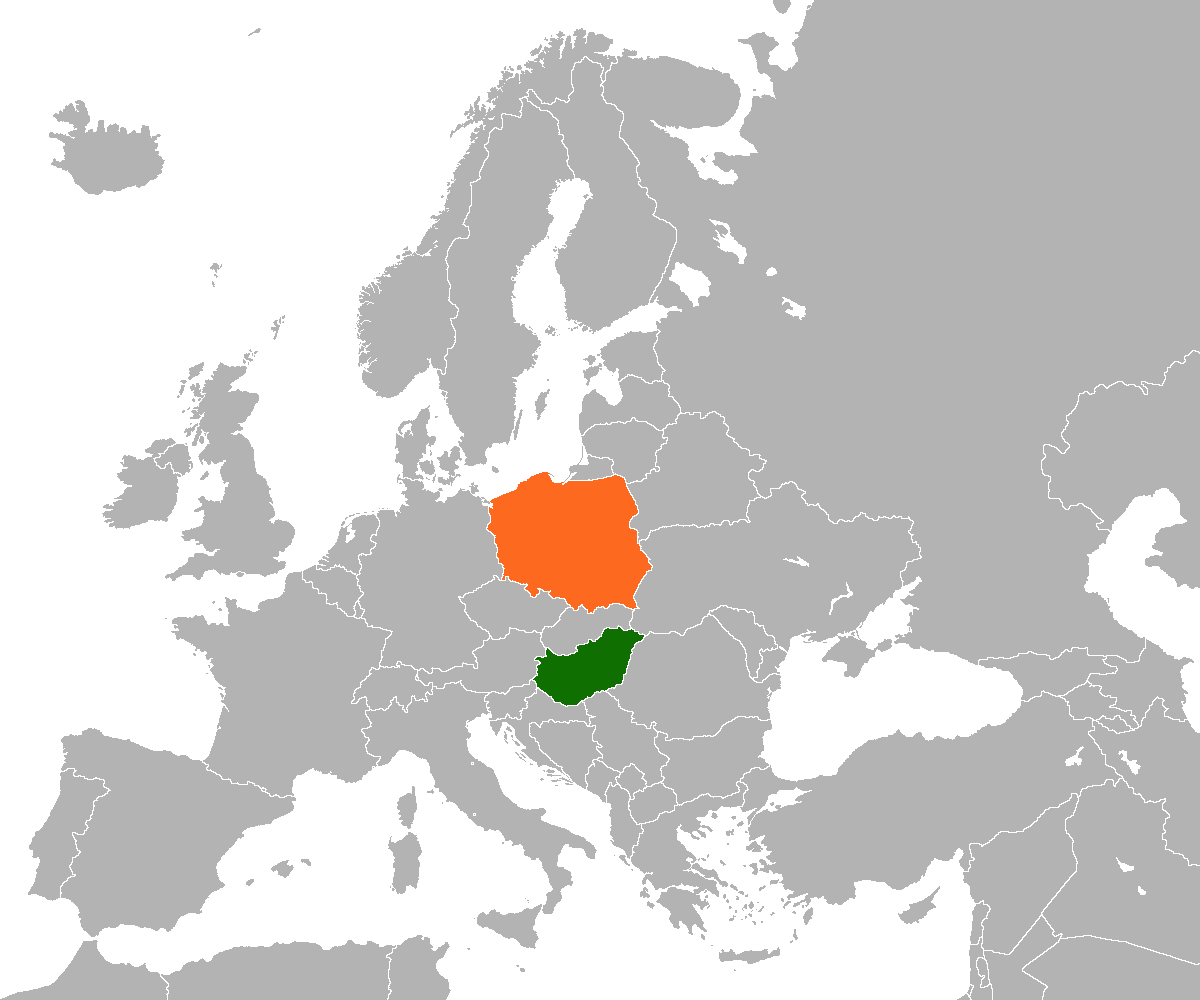

- Hungary: Poland

Hungary–Poland relations date back to the Middle Ages. The two Central European peoples have traditionally enjoyed a very close friendship, brotherhood and camaraderie rooted in a deep history of shared rulers, cultures, struggles, and faith. Both countries commemorate their fraternal relationship on 23 March. From 1370 to 1382 the Kingdom of Poland and Kingdom of Hungary entered into a personal union and were ruled by the same King, Louis the Great. This period in Polish history is sometimes known as the Andegawen Poland. Louis inherited the Polish throne from his maternal uncle Casimir III. After Louis's death the Polish nobles (the szlachta) decided to end the personal union, since they did not want to be governed from Hungary, and chose Louis's younger daughter Jadwiga as their new ruler, while Hungary was inherited by his elder daughter Mary. A second personal union with Poland was formed for the second time from 1440 to 1444, when King Władysław III of Poland was also King of Hungary.

Both countries are full members of NATO, joining it on the same day (March 12, 1999) and are also both members of the European Union, the OECD, the Council of Europe, the Visegrád Four (along with Slovakia and the Czech Republic), the Bucharest Nine, the Three Seas Initiative, the OSCE and the World Trade Organization.

The leaders of the two countries have been holding regular secret meetings to improve bilateral relations and work more closely together. Hungarian-Polish political scientist Dominik Hejj states: "The relations are very strong, and almost every week a Polish minister visits Hungary and vice versa". The two countries first joined NATO in 1999 and then the European Union in 2004.

== Historic relations ==
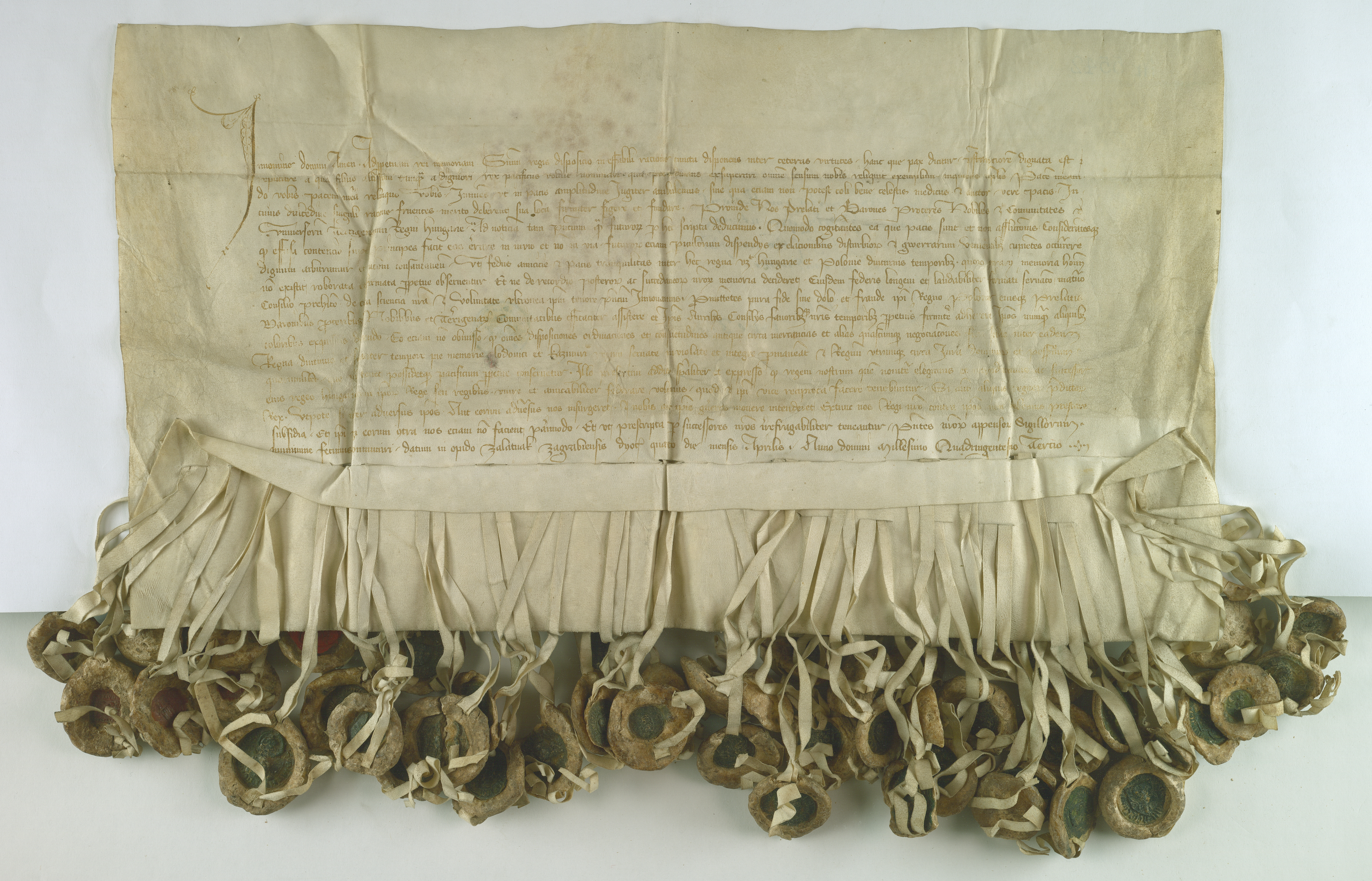
Act of renewal of the Hungarian-Polish alliance, 1403

Good relations between Poland and Hungary date back to the Middle Ages. Both countries shared a border for nearly 800 years, from the 10th century to the First Partition of Poland in 1772. The Polish and Hungarian ruling dynasties (such as the Piast dynasty or House of Árpád) often intermarried.

Since the mid-13th century, trade between Hungary and Poland has increased significantly, as well as the transit of Hungarian goods through Poland to Baltic ports and German countries, and foreign (Flemish, English, German) products in the opposite direction, reaching its peak during the Hungarian-Polish union under the reign of Louis I.

In 1320 King Charles I of Hungary married Princess Elizabeth of Poland and a Hungarian–Polish alliance was formed, which benefited both countries. It helped Hungary defeat the Holy Roman Empire and Austria in the war of 1322–1337, whereas in 1327 a diplomatic intervention of Charles I prevented a subjugation of Polish territories to King John of Bohemia, and Hungary aided Poland in the Polish–Teutonic War of 1326–1332. Louis the Great was king of Hungary and Croatia from 1342 and king of Poland from 1370 until his death in 1382. He was his father's heir, Charles I of the House of Anjou-Sicily (King of Hungary and Croatia) and his uncle's heir, Casimir III the Great (king of Poland – last of the Piast dynasty). King Casimir had no legitimate sons. Apparently, in order to provide a clear line of succession and avoid dynastic uncertainty, he arranged for his nephew, King Louis I of Hungary, to be his successor in Poland. Louis' younger daughter Saint Jadwiga of Poland inherited the Polish throne, and became one of the most popular monarchs of Poland.

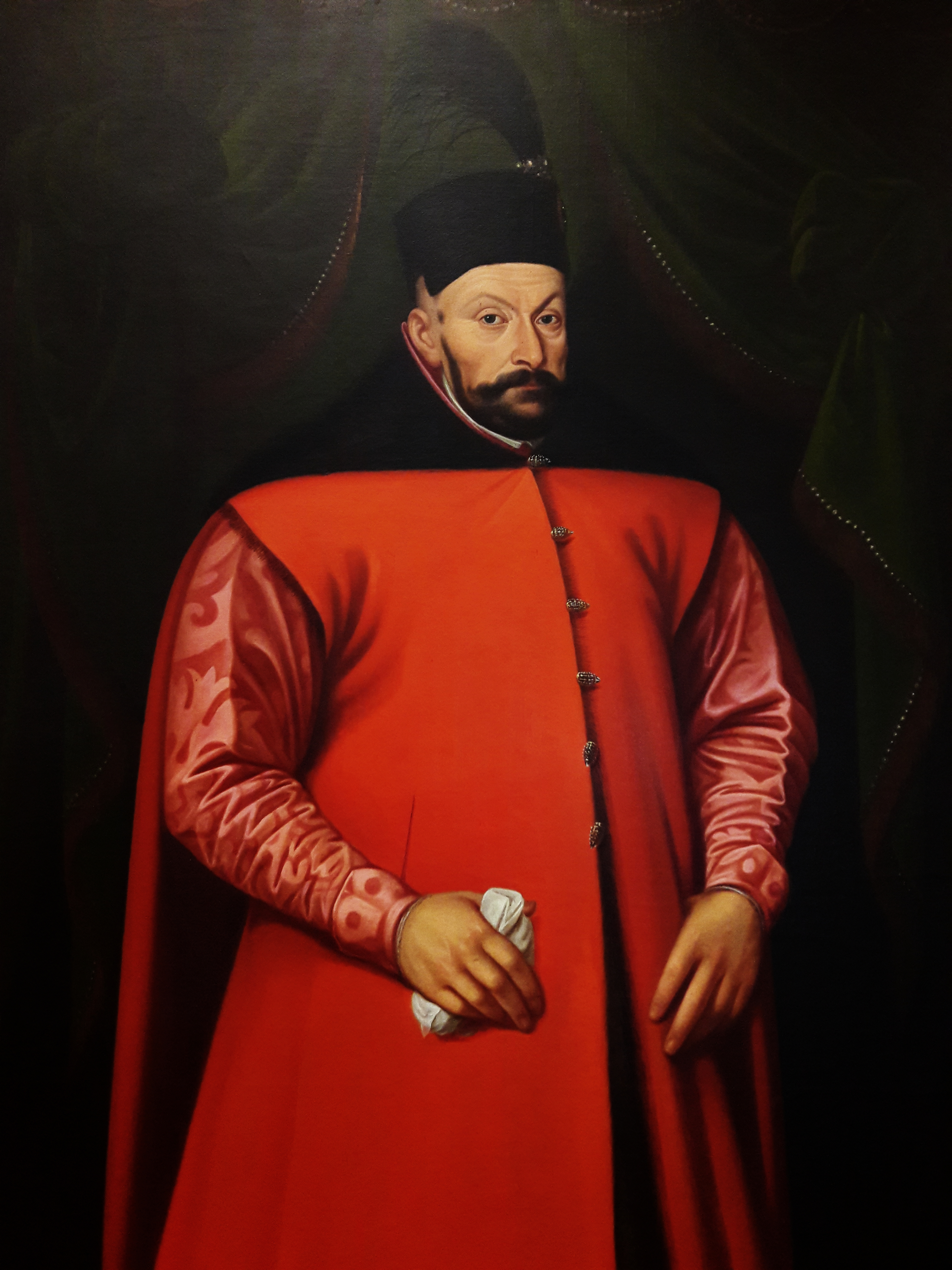
Stephen Báthory was a member of the Hungarian Báthory noble family and was crowned King of Poland following his election to the Polish throne in 1576

Hungarians and Poles fought together against the Ottoman invasion of Europe at the Battle of Nicopolis in 1396 as part of a larger European coalition led by King Sigismund of Hungary. In 1440–1444, the two countries shared the same King again, after King Władysław III of Poland became also King of Hungary. He was eventually killed in the Battle of Varna in which a coalition of Central and Eastern European countries led by Poland and Hungary was defeated by the Turks. Poles fought on the side of Hungary in subsequent Ottoman–Hungarian wars, including the battles of Kosovo (1448) and Mohács (1526). From 1490 to 1526, both countries were ruled by separate but closely related branches of the Jagiellonian dynasty, after Polish prince Władysław, son of Polish King Casimir IV Jagiellon, became King Vladislaus II of Hungary. In 1576, Poland elected the Hungarian nobleman Stephen Báthory as its king, who is regarded as one of Poland's greatest rulers. The great Hungarian Renaissance poet Bálint Balassi spent parts of his life and wrote some of his poems in Poland. There are memorials to him at his places of stay in Odrzykoń, Nowy Żmigród, Rymanów, Dębno, Braniewo and Kraków. The famous Polish hussars were modelled after Hungarian hussars.

=== Hungarian and Polish fights for independence ===
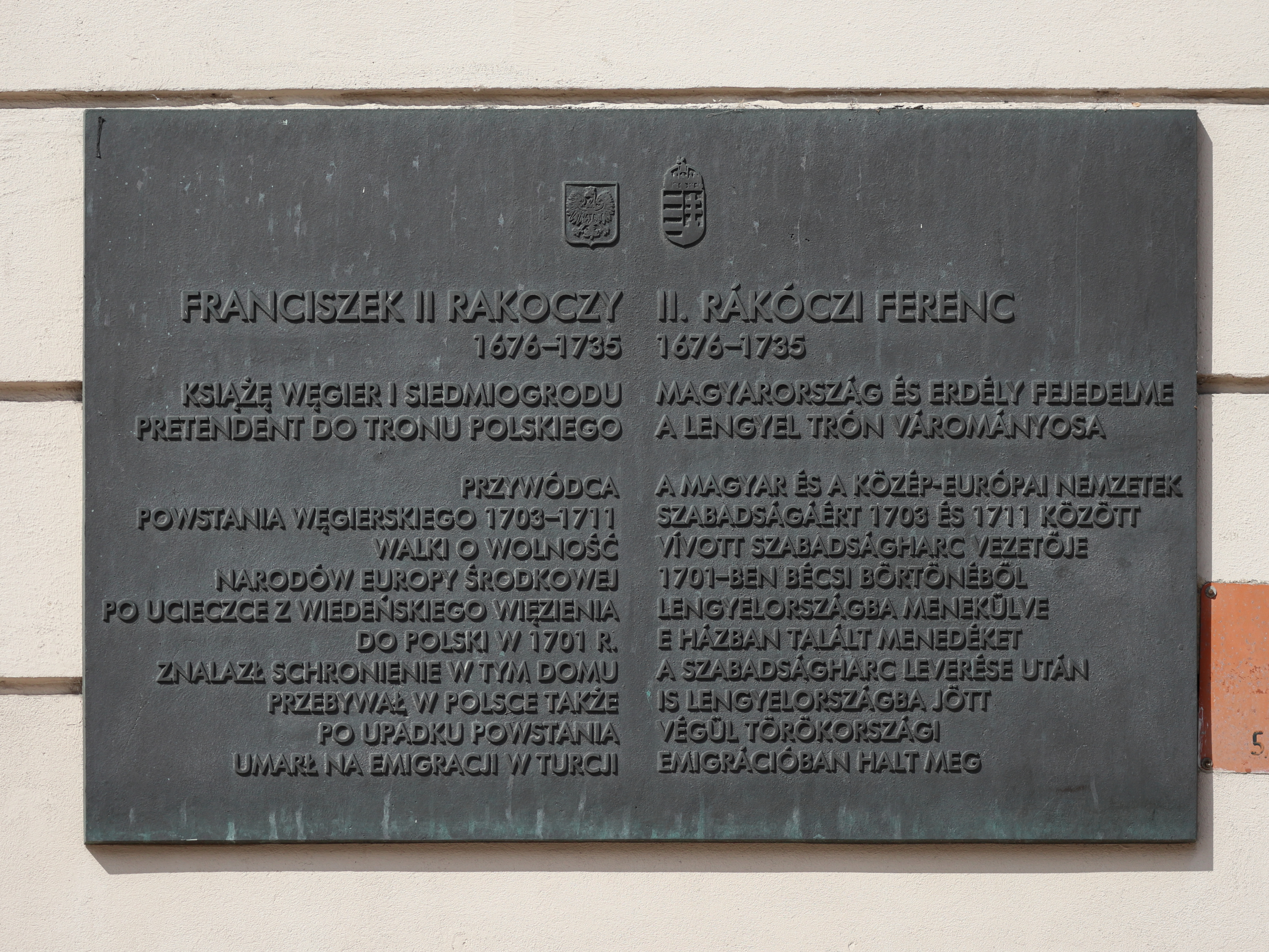
Memorial plaque at the place of stay of Francis II Rákóczi in Warsaw in 1701

Poles gave shelter to Hungarian insurgents and aided them during the Rákóczi's War of Independence against Austria. In 1701 Hungarian conspirators Miklós Bercsényi and Francis II Rákóczi fled to Poland, where they established contacts with the Polish Royal court and gained the support of several Polish magnates for the planned Hungarian uprising. In Poland, Bercsényi and Rákóczi received protection from the Austrians, who still tried to capture them through attempts of the Habsburg ambassador to Poland. After the Hungarian uprising broke out in 1703, an insurgent delegation went to Poland to find Rákóczi and ask him to lead the uprising. A meeting of the then insurgent leader Tamás Esze with Rákóczi and Bercsényi took place in May 1703 in Brzeżany, Poland, and it also was the place where Rákóczi and Bercsényi signed a proclamation, which called on Hungarians to fight for independence. Rákóczi and Bercsényi then went to Hungary separately, each with Polish troops lent by Polish magnates. In September 1703, Polish King Augustus II the Strong in an official document to the port city of Gdańsk prohibited the purchase of weapons for the Hungarian insurgents, but at the same time he secretly assured Rákóczi of his friendship, and many weapons were supplied to the Hungarians through Gdańsk during the war. The Hungarians maintained close contact with Poland, both through correspondence and their envoys, and also thanks to the numerous visits of Poles at Rákóczi's court in Szentmiklós in 1707–1710.

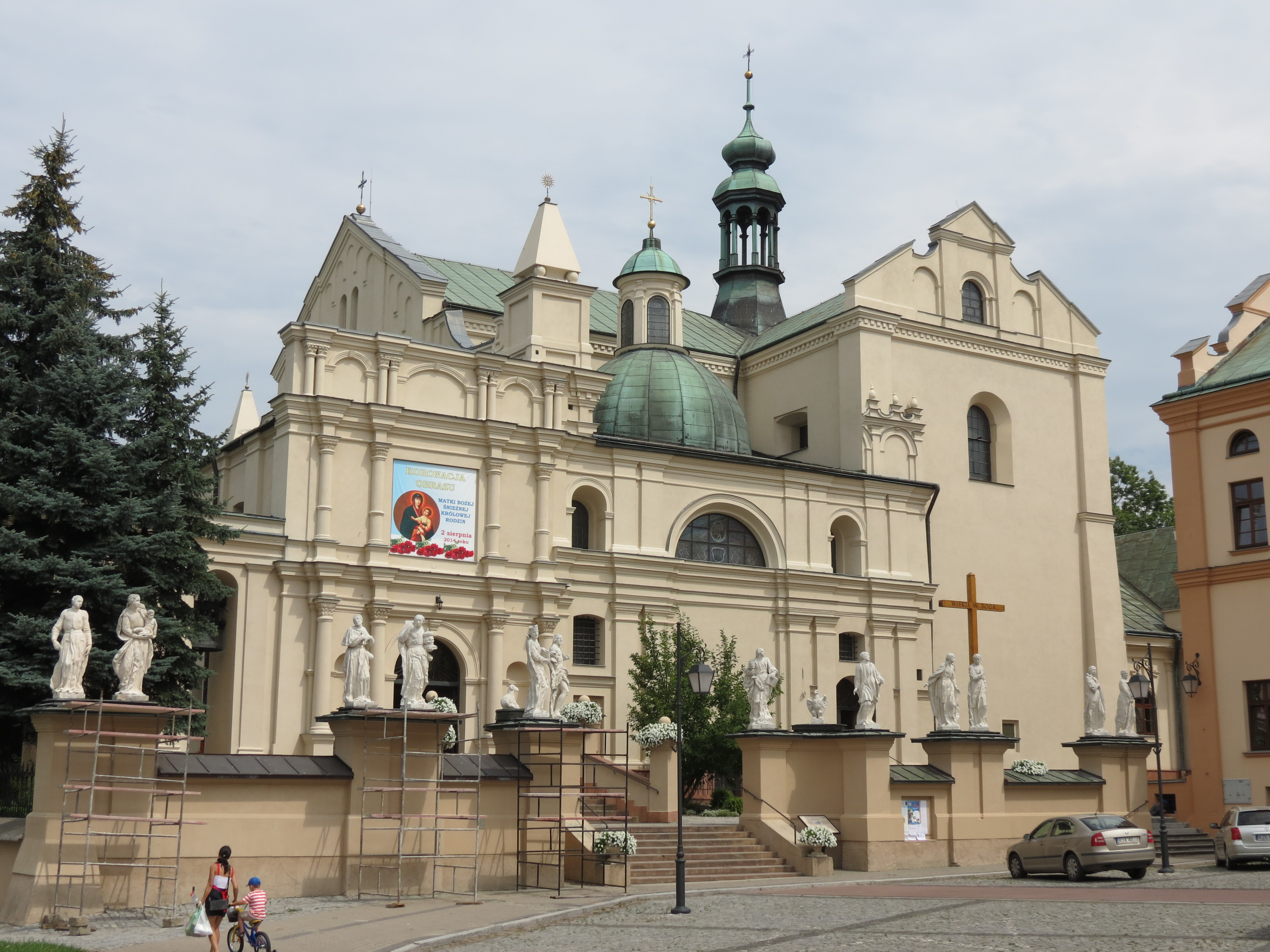
Corpus Christi Collegiate Church in Jarosław, burial place of several Hungarian post-1711 refugees to Poland before their exhumation and burial in Hungary in 1907

After the fall of the uprising in 1711, 3,000 Kurucs, including Rákóczi himself, took refuge in Poland. Rákóczi then lived in Jarosław and Gdańsk before leaving Poland in 1712 for France, where he unsuccessfully sought support for Hungarian national liberation efforts. A number of Hungarians remained in Poland, including painter Ádám Mányoki, who became a court painter of Polish Kings, and Ádám Jávorka, who became a general of the Polish Army.

There were cases of Hungarians, who in small groups or individually, made their way to the Russian Partition of Poland to help the Polish November Uprising of 1830–1831. The Hungarian counties voiced their support for the uprising. In 1832, after the fall of the uprising, the Hungarian parliament agreed with the position of the Hungarian counties on the uprising. The pro-Polish stance of the Hungarian parliament was exceptional among the predominantly indifferent European countries. After the uprising, the Polish National Committee formed in exile in Paris issued a proclamation to the Hungarian people, thanking them for their support, stating that "there was no nation which would more openly and boldly acknowledge the friendship and righteousness of our cause." Among the founding members of the committee was Charles Kraitsir, a Hungarian-born doctor decorated with the Order of Virtuti Militari for his services in the November Uprising, who spent the rest of his life as part of the Polish Great Emigration. Committee leader Joachim Lelewel saw him as a link between the committee and the Hungarian people. Kraitsir issued a proclamation to the Hungarian people, calling for help for the Polish emigration in Western Europe. This proclamation was smuggled into Austrian-ruled Hungary, and its distribution carried the risk of repression by the Austrians.

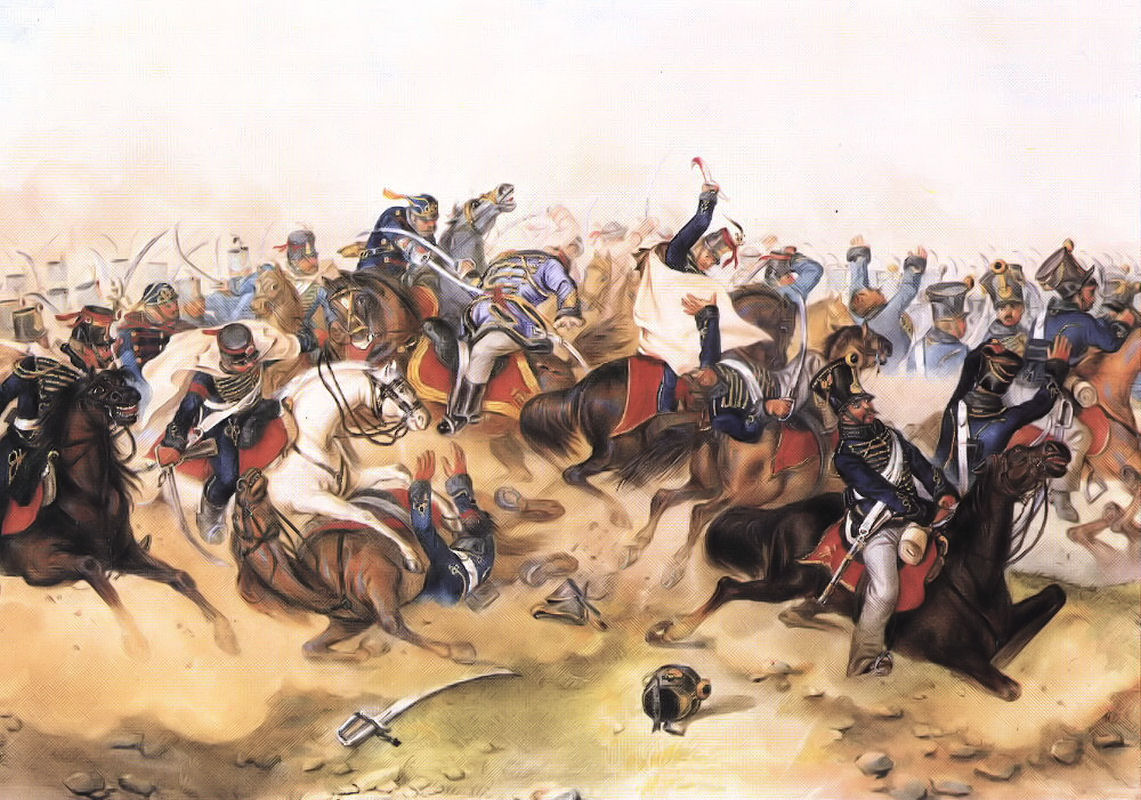
Battle of Tápióbicske in which Hungarians and Poles defeated the Austrians during the Hungarian Revolution of 1848

In the Hungarian Revolution of 1848, a Polish general, Józef Bem, became a national hero of both Hungary and Poland. He was entrusted with the defence of Transylvania at the end of 1848, and in 1849, as General of the Székely troops. On October 20, 1848 Józef Wysocki signed an agreement with the Hungarian government to form a Polish infantry battalion of about 1,200 soldiers. After the agreement, Wysocki organized the Polish Legion in Hungary, which contained 2,090 infantry soldiers and 400 Polish uhlans. They took part in the siege of the Arad fortress in the spring of 1849 and participated in all important battles at Szolnok, Hatvan, Tápióbicske and Isaszeg. After the Battle of Temesvár in August 1849, and the Hungarian capitulation at Világos, 800 of the remnants of the Legion escaped to Turkey.

As part of the International Legion in Italy, both Hungarians and Poles led by István Türr and Ludwik Mierosławski fought alongside Giuseppe Garibaldi in the Expedition of the Thousand of 1860–1861, which paved the way for the creation of a united Kingdom of Italy in 1861. Afterwards, Poles and Hungarians in exile worked together to organize a large-scale uprising of Hungarians, Poles and Italians against Austria, while Poles and Hungarians in the Austrian Partition of Poland and Austrian-ruled Hungary cooperated to achieve political and cultural autonomy for their nations, including the right to use their native languages, and to hinder Austrian attempts to centralize power in Vienna. In Paris, György Klapka, Ludwik Mierosławski and Giuseppe Garibaldi decided that Hungarian and Italian revolutionaries would help in the event of a Polish uprising.

In 1861, the Austrian Emperor dissolved the Hungarian parliament because of its resistance to the Austrian plan of centralization of administration, and then the Austrians implemented their orders by force, and even declared a state of emergency in Hungary and threatened to repress resistant Hungarians. Polish politicians from Galicia (Austrian Partition of Poland) spoke out against such Austrian policies and defended the political and historical rights of the Hungarian people. Franciszek Jan Smolka, Polish deputy who delivered a splendid speech against the Austrian centralist plans and in defense of the rights of the Hungarians, received dozens of letters of thanks and honorary citizenships from Hungarian counties and towns. In response, Smolka thanked the Hungarian people in an open letter, assuring them of the friendship of the Polish nation and declaring to the Hungarians that "your cause is our cause, and our cause is your cause."

Several hundred Hungarian volunteers fought alongside Poles in the January Uprising in the Russian Partition of Poland in 1863–1864, forming a large group among the foreign volunteers. Among them were Major Edward Nyáry and Captain Albert Esterhazy, who died at the battles of Panasówka and Mełchów respectively. In Hungary, funds and weapons were collected by the people and sent to the Polish insurgents. After the fall of the uprising, about 4,000 Polish refugees were received in Hungary.

=== Interwar years 1919–1939 ===
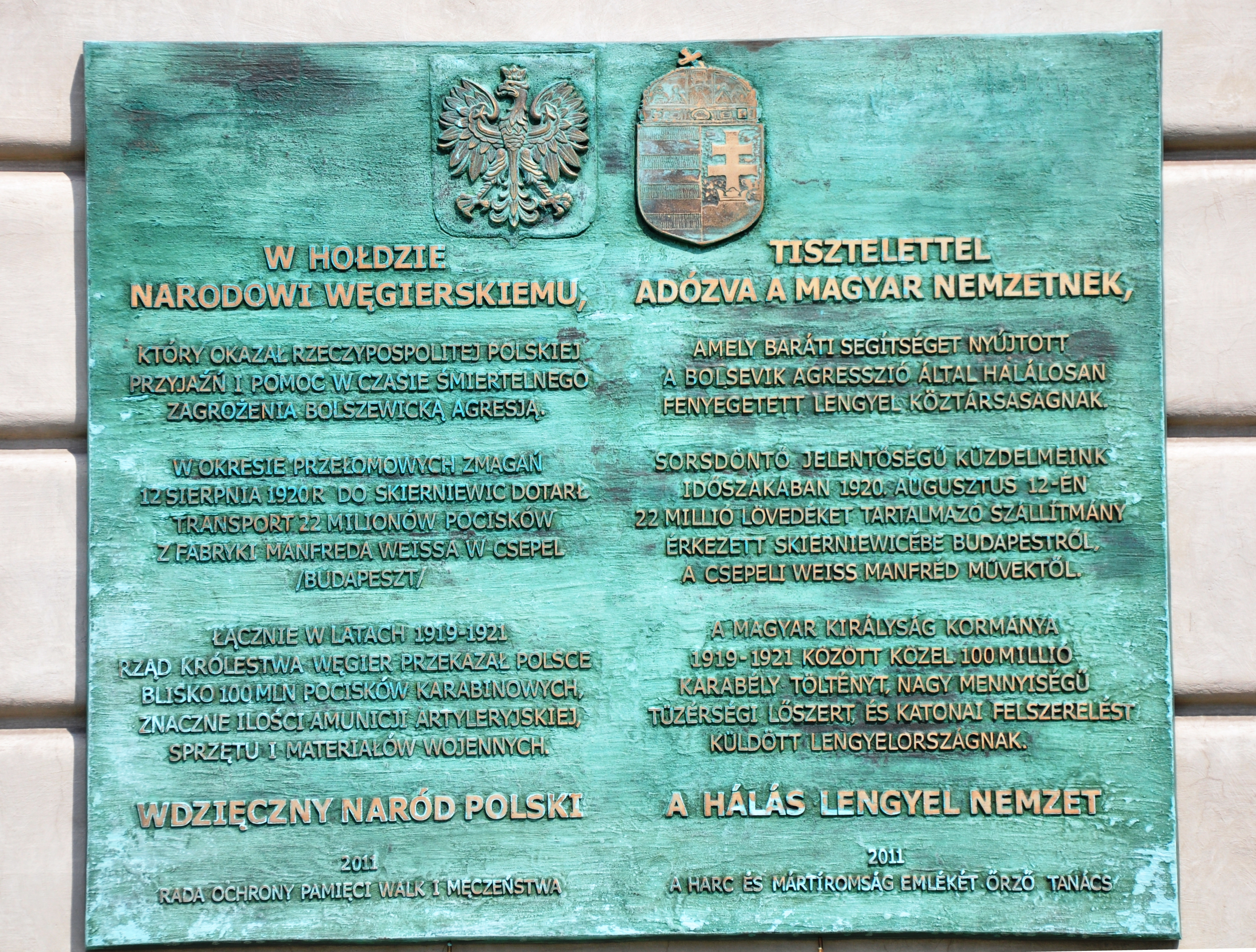
Plaque in Warsaw commemorating Hungarian aid to Poland during the Polish–Soviet War of 1919–1921

Friendship between Poland and Hungary typified the interwar period. However Poland was among the victors of World War I, and therefore supported the status quo, while Hungary suffered unparalleled losses, and therefore pursued a revisionist policy. The ruling forces in both countries suppressed all revolutionary movements, and forced the Communist Party underground. As a result, both were hostile to Soviet Russia and Czechoslovakia. Support for a pro-Hungarian policy in Poland came mainly from conservative aristocratic centers in Kraków and Wilno. Anti-Czech feelings led Poland and Hungary to support Hitler during the Munich crisis in 1938. However pro-Polish feelings made it impossible for Hungary to side with Hitler against Poland when it invaded in 1939.

During the Polish–Soviet War (1919–21), after the Béla Kun government in Hungary was overthrown, Hungary offered to send 30,000 cavalry to Poland's aid, but the Czechoslovak government refused to allow them through the demilitarized zone that had existed between Czechoslovakia and Hungary since the end of the First World War. Nevertheless, Hungarian munitions trains did reach Poland.

In the beginning of July 1920, the Hungarian government of Prime Minister Pál Teleki made a decision to help Poland, delivering for free and at a critical moment of war at Hungary's own expense through Romania's military supply: 48 million rounds of Mauser ammunition, 13 million rounds of Mannlicher ammunition, artillery ammunition, 30 thousand Mauser rifles and several million spare parts, 440 field kitchens, and 80 field ovens. On August 12, 1920, Skierniewice received transport, among others 22 million rounds to Mauser from the Manfréd Weiss factory in Csepel. It was the single most important foreign military contribution to Polish war effort. Hundreds of Hungarian volunteers fought on the side of Poland in the war, and some stayed in Poland after the war.

The first international match of the Poland national football team was a friendly game against Hungary played in Budapest in 1921.

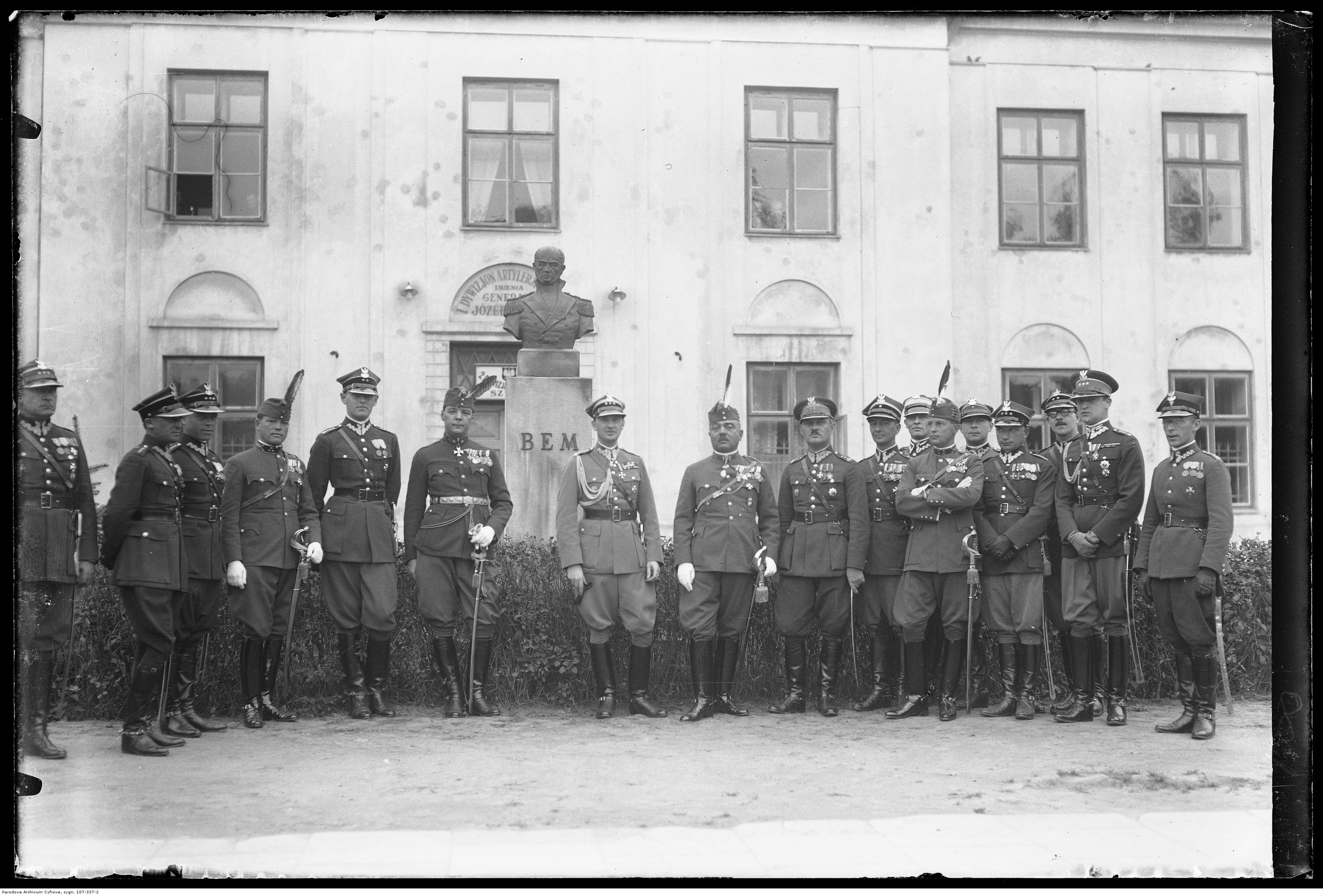
Polish and Hungarian military officers in Warsaw in 1930

From the Middle Ages well into the 20th century, Poland and Hungary had shared a historic common border. In the aftermath of World War I, the victorious allies had, at Versailles, transferred Upper Hungary as well as Carpathian Ruthenia, with its Slavic population, from defeated Hungary to Slavic-German-Hungarian nascent Czechoslovakia. Following the Munich Agreement (September 30, 1938) — which doomed Czechoslovakia to takeover by Germany — Poland and Hungary, from common as well as their own special interests, worked together, by diplomatic as well as paramilitary means, to restore their historic common border by engineering the return of Carpathian Rus to Hungary. A step toward their goal was realized with the First Vienna Award (November 2, 1938).

Until mid-March 1939, Germany considered that, for military reasons, a common Hungarian-Polish frontier was undesirable. Indeed, when in March 1939 Hitler made an about-face and authorized Hungary to take over the rest of Carpatho-Rus (which was by then styling itself "Carpatho-Ukraine"), he warned Hungary not to touch the remainder of Slovakia, to whose territory Hungary also laid claim. Hitler meant to use Slovakia as a staging ground for his planned invasion of Poland. In March 1939, however, Hitler changed his mind about the common Hungarian-Polish frontier and decided to betray Germany's ally, the Organization of Ukrainian Nationalists, who had already in 1938 begun organizing Ukrainian military units in a sich outside Uzhhorod, in Carpathian Ukraine, under German tutelage — a sich that Polish political and military authorities saw as an imminent danger to nearby southeastern Poland, with its largely Ukrainian population. (Note: On 17 September 1939, pursuant to the Molotov–Ribbentrop Pact, the Soviet Union entered and took control of eastern Poland, including southeastern Poland. That former southeastern part of Poland now comprises western Ukraine.) Hitler, however, was concerned that, if a Ukrainian army organized in Carpathian Rus were to accompany German forces invading the Soviet Union, Ukrainian nationalists would insist on the establishment of an independent Ukraine; Hitler, who had designs on Ukraine's natural and agricultural resources, did not want to deal with an independent Ukrainian government.

=== World War II ===
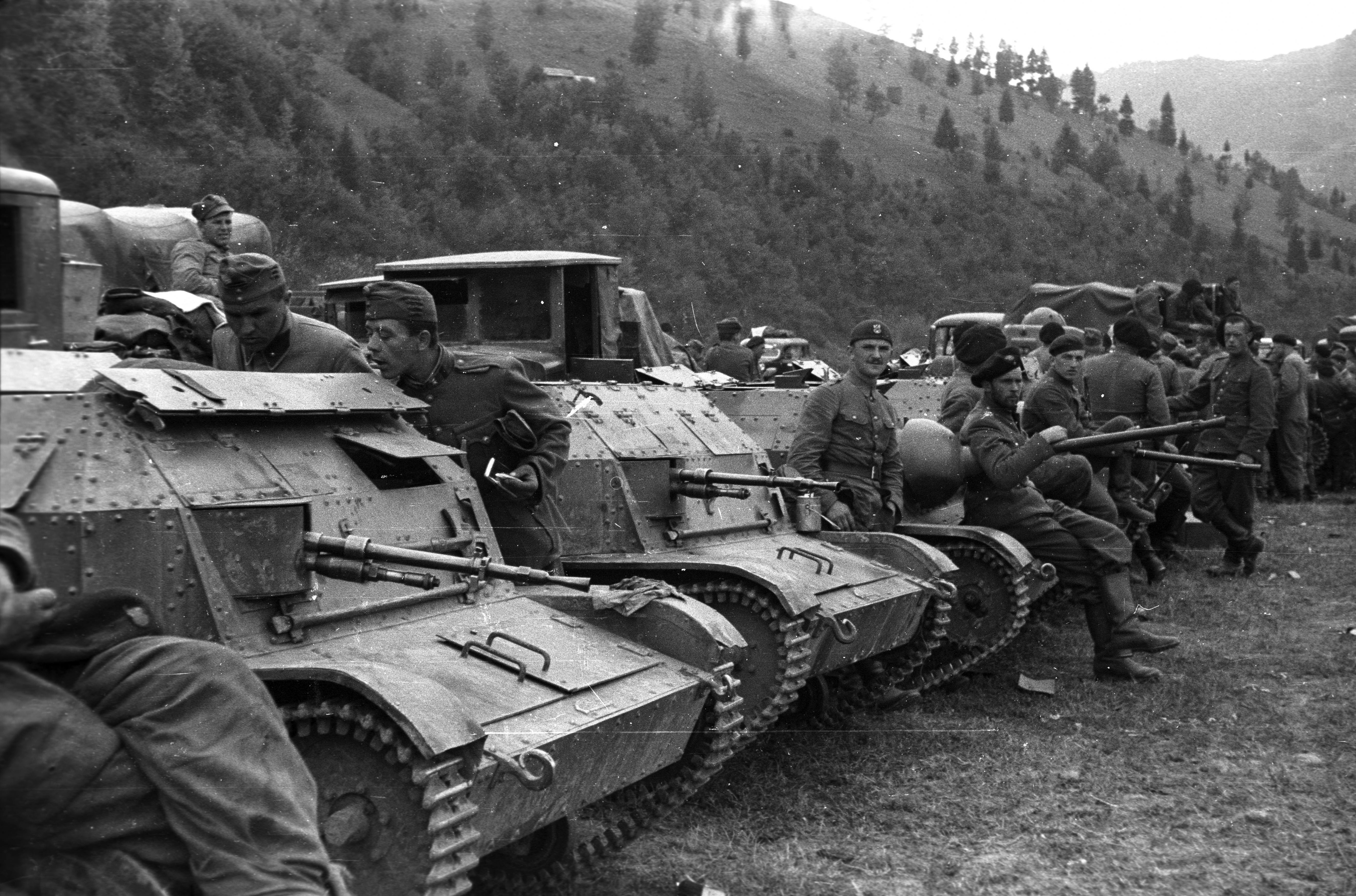
Polish troops withdrawn to Hungary in September 1939

Hitler would soon have cause to rue his decision regarding the fate of Carpatho-Ukraine. In six months, during his 1939 invasion of Poland, the common Polish-Hungarian border would become of major importance when Admiral Horthy's government, on the ground of long-standing Polish-Hungarian friendship, declined, as a matter of "Hungarian honor," Hitler's request to transit German forces across Carpathian Rus into southeastern Poland to speed up that country's conquest. The Hungarian refusal allowed the Polish government and tens of thousands of military personnel to escape into neighboring Hungary and Romania, and from there to France and French-mandated Syria to carry on operations as the third-strongest Allied belligerent after Britain and France. Also, for a time Polish and British intelligence agents and couriers, including Krystyna Skarbek, used Hungary's Carpathorus as a route across the Carpathian Mountains to and from Poland. In total, over 100,000 military and civilians, including children, fled from Poland to Hungary.

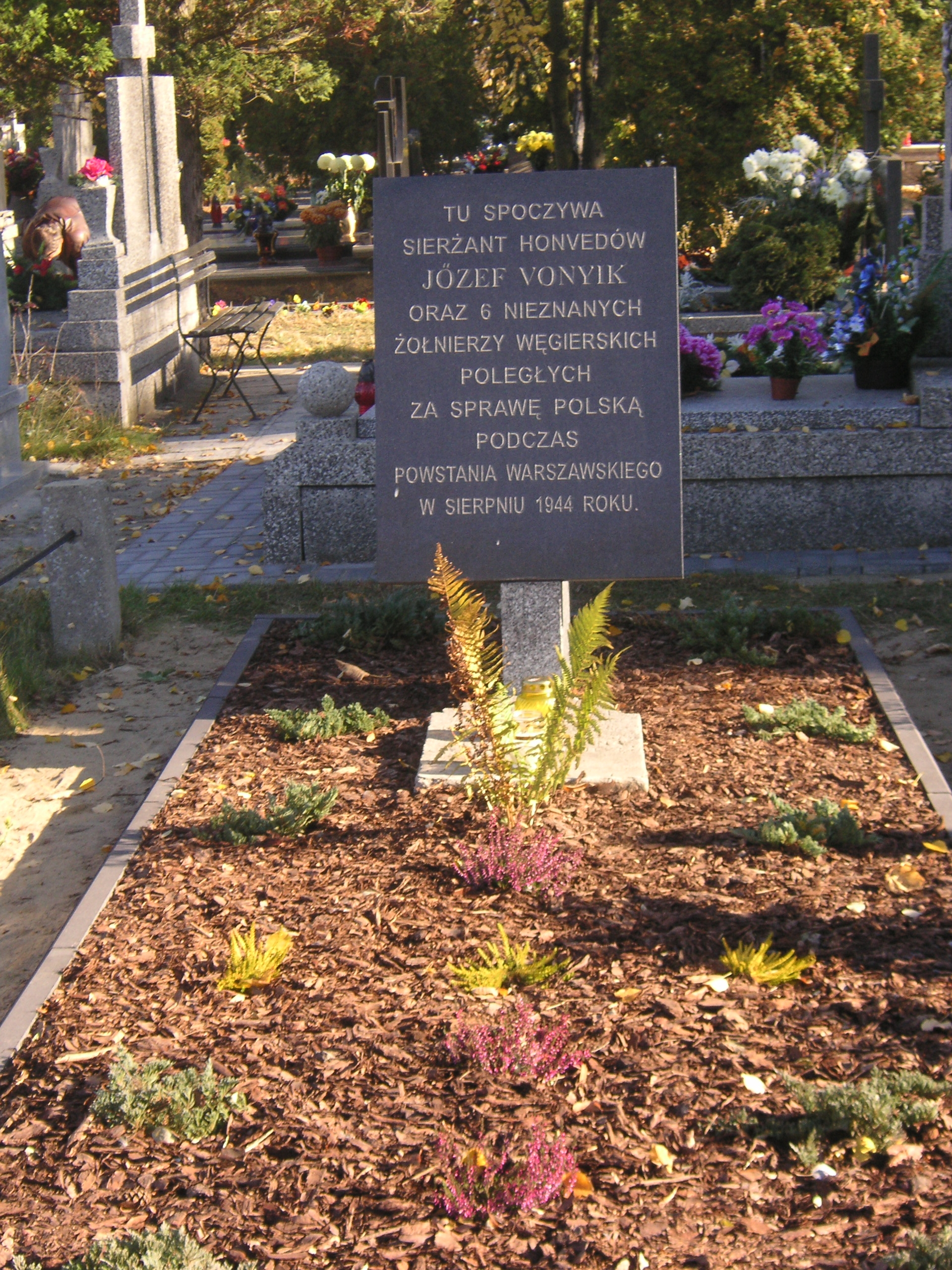
Grave of a Hungarian Honvéd captain and six of his men who fell, fighting on the Polish side in the 1944 Warsaw Uprising

The Hungarian authorities resisted German pressure to close the Polish Institute in Budapest, a Polish cultural institution established before the war. In order to do so, the Hungarians referred to the autonomy of the Royal Hungarian Pázmány Péter University, whose employee was the director of the institute, Professor Zbigniew Załęski. The institute was a place where Polish culture was freely and legally cultivated at a time when it was brutally suppressed in German- and Soviet-occupied Poland and Europe. The institute also published Polish literature and press, and in addition to cultural activities, it helped Polish refugees and civilians in Hungary, and gave Hungarian language lessons to Poles so that they could study at Hungarian universities. It was closed only in 1944 due to the German occupation of Hungary, to be reopened after the war in 1951.

Dozens of Polish elementary schools were established in Hungary, 27 of which existed throughout the entire stay of Poles in Hungary, as well as high schools, including the significant Gymnasium and Lyceum in Balatonboglár, which functioned until the German invasion of Hungary in 1944.

In German-occupied southeastern Poland, Hungarian soldiers gave shelter to Poles fleeing Ukrainian-perpetrated massacres, aided the Polish population with food, repelled attacks on Poles and Jews by Ukrainian nationalists, and hunted Ukrainian murderers of Poles. In 1941, the Organization of Ukrainian Nationalists called for the mass murder of Poles, Hungarians, Jews and Russians. In 1944, Hungarians gave shelter to Poles who escaped the Ukrainian murderers to Hungary, and also facilitated further escapes.

In 1944, Hungarian soldiers refused to help Germans suppress the Warsaw Uprising in German-occupied Poland. Instead, Hungarians gave weapons, ammunition and medical supplies to the Polish insurgents. Some Hungarians who were caught doing so were executed by the Germans. Captured Polish insurgents were bandaged and fed by Hungarians, then released, given weapons and food, and shown the way out of German encirclement. Hungarians also rescued Polish insurgents by refusing to turn them over to the Germans, warned Poles of planned German pacifications, and took care of surviving Polish civilians. Some Hungarians even joined the fights on the side of the Polish insurgents. After the uprising, Hungarians shared food, medicines, and bandages with the expelled Polish population, whom they were supposed to convoy. The Hungarians also managed to save some Poles from deportation to German forced labour camps and concentration camps, for example by unhitching some of the wagons on the deportation trains.

=== Revolution of 1956 ===
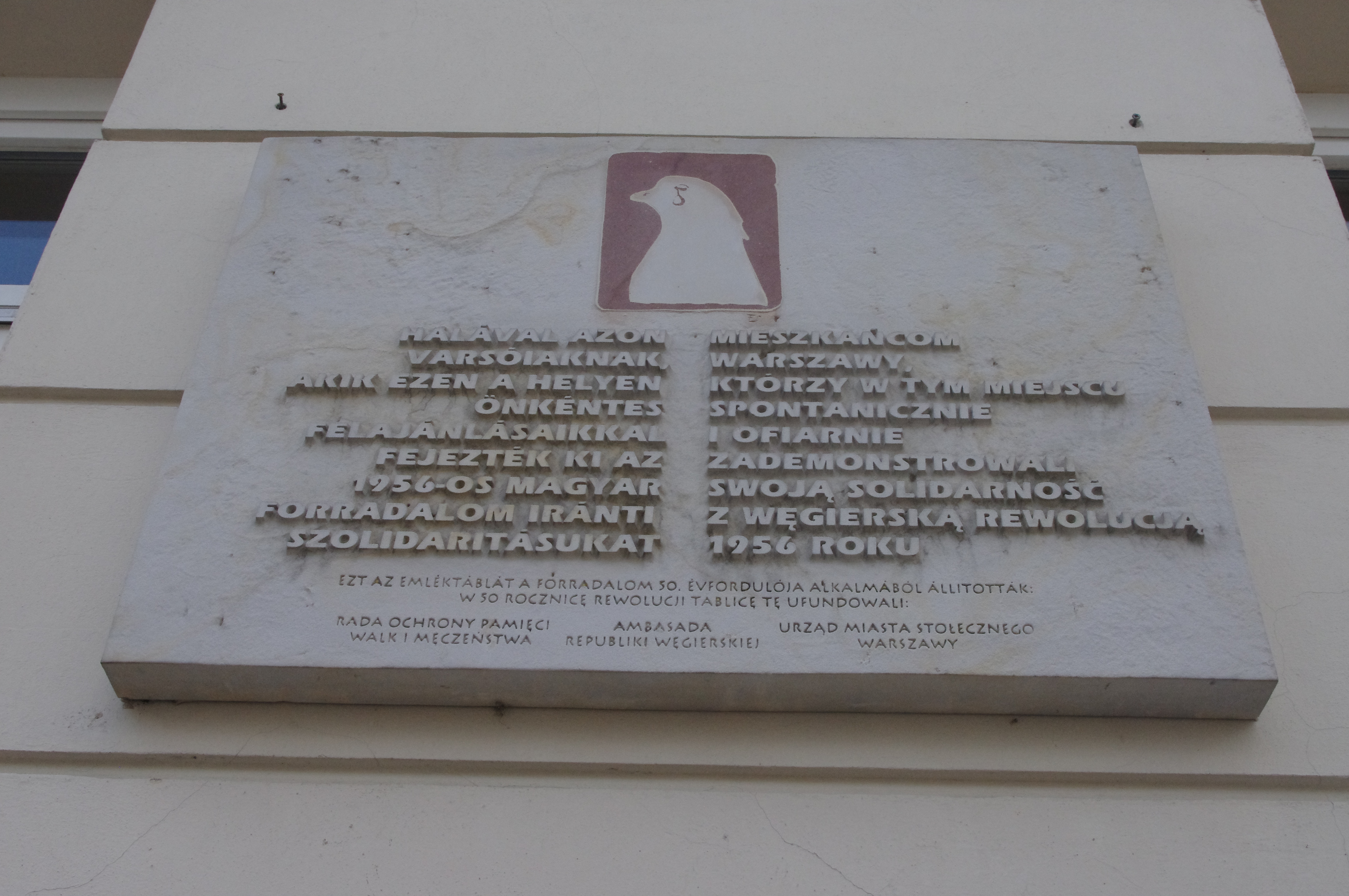
Memorial plaque in Warsaw at the place where Poles spontaneously showed solidarity with the Hungarian Revolution of 1956

A student demonstration in Budapest in support of the Polish October and asking for similar reforms in Hungary was one of the events that sparked the Hungarian Revolution of 1956. During the revolution, Poles demonstrated their support for the Hungarians by donating blood for them; by 12 November 1956, 11,196 Poles had donated. The Polish Red Cross sent 44 tons of medical supplies to Hungary by air; even larger amounts were sent by road and rail. Also, funds and food were sent to Hungary, and demonstrations of support for the Hungarians were organized in various cities. Polish aid to Hungary was the largest of all countries. One-third of all worldwide aid came from Poland. There are several memorials commemorating Polish aid to Hungarians, including a monument in Budapest, and monuments and plaques in Szczecin, Lublin, Kraków, Białystok, Olsztyn, Wrocław, Warsaw, Poznań and Gdańsk (funded or co-funded by the Hungarians).

== Modern relations ==
There is a Polish Institute in Budapest and a Hungarian Cultural Institute in Warsaw.

Polish firefighters helped in flood recovery in Hungary in 2000.

On March 12, 2007, Hungary's parliament declared March 23 the "Day of Hungarian-Polish Friendship", with 324 votes in favor, none opposed, and no abstentions. Four days later, the Polish parliament declared March 23 the "Day of Polish-Hungarian Friendship" by acclamation.

=== Closer relations in the 2010s ===
April 18, 2010, day of the state funeral of Lech and Maria Kaczyński, was declared a day of national mourning in Hungary to commemorate the 96 victims of the Smolensk air disaster, including Polish President Lech Kaczyński and his wife Maria Kaczyńska. The President, Prime Minister and former Prime Minister of Hungary attended the funeral in Kraków.

In 2015–2016, Polish Border Guard and police officers assisted their Hungarian counterparts in protecting Hungary's border during the European migrant crisis.

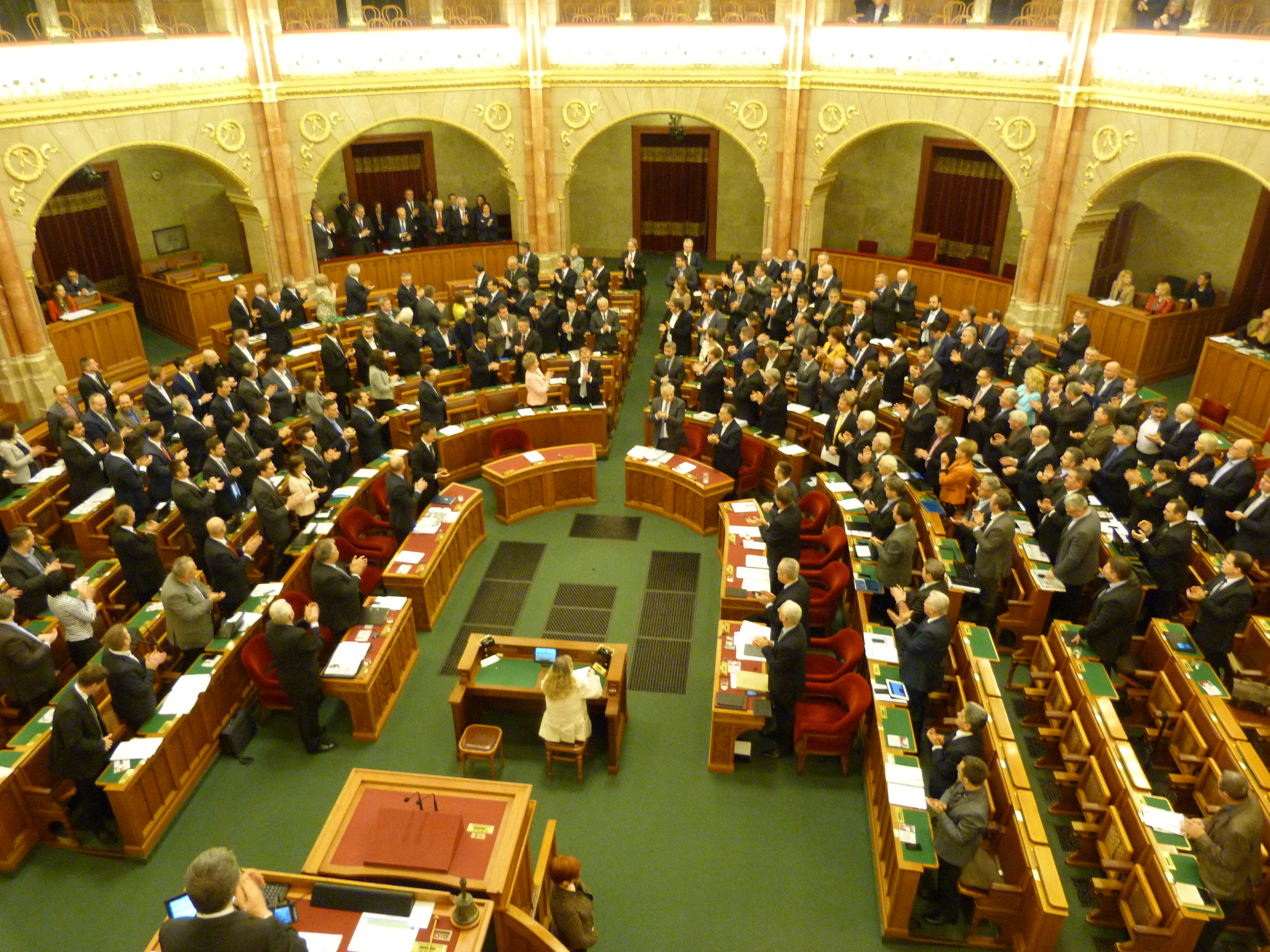
Standing ovation in the Hungarian Parliament after passing into law: 2016 - the Year of Hungarian-Polish Solidarity

The Hungarian Parliament on 29 February 2016 adopted a decree in a unanimous vote that declared 2016 a year of Hungarian-Polish solidarity. Under the order, state celebrations were organized throughout the year to mark the 60th anniversary of the anti-communist uprising in Poland's Poznań in June 1956. Hungary's anti-Soviet revolution was four months later. The decree was submitted by the House speaker, the Polish minority in Hungary, and the group leaders of the five parliamentary parties. An order with the same content was adopted by the Polish Senate and by the Sejm earlier that month.

Poland is one of Hungary's main trading partners. In 2019, Poland was the fourth largest source of imports and the eighth largest export destination for Hungary.

In February 2021, Hungary returned to Poland the Renaissance armor of Polish King Sigismund II Augustus, which ended up in Hungary in the interbellum as a result of a misunderstanding, as it was believed to be the armor of King Louis II of Hungary. The gesture is perceived as another example of Polish-Hungarian friendship.

=== Russo-Ukrainian war ===
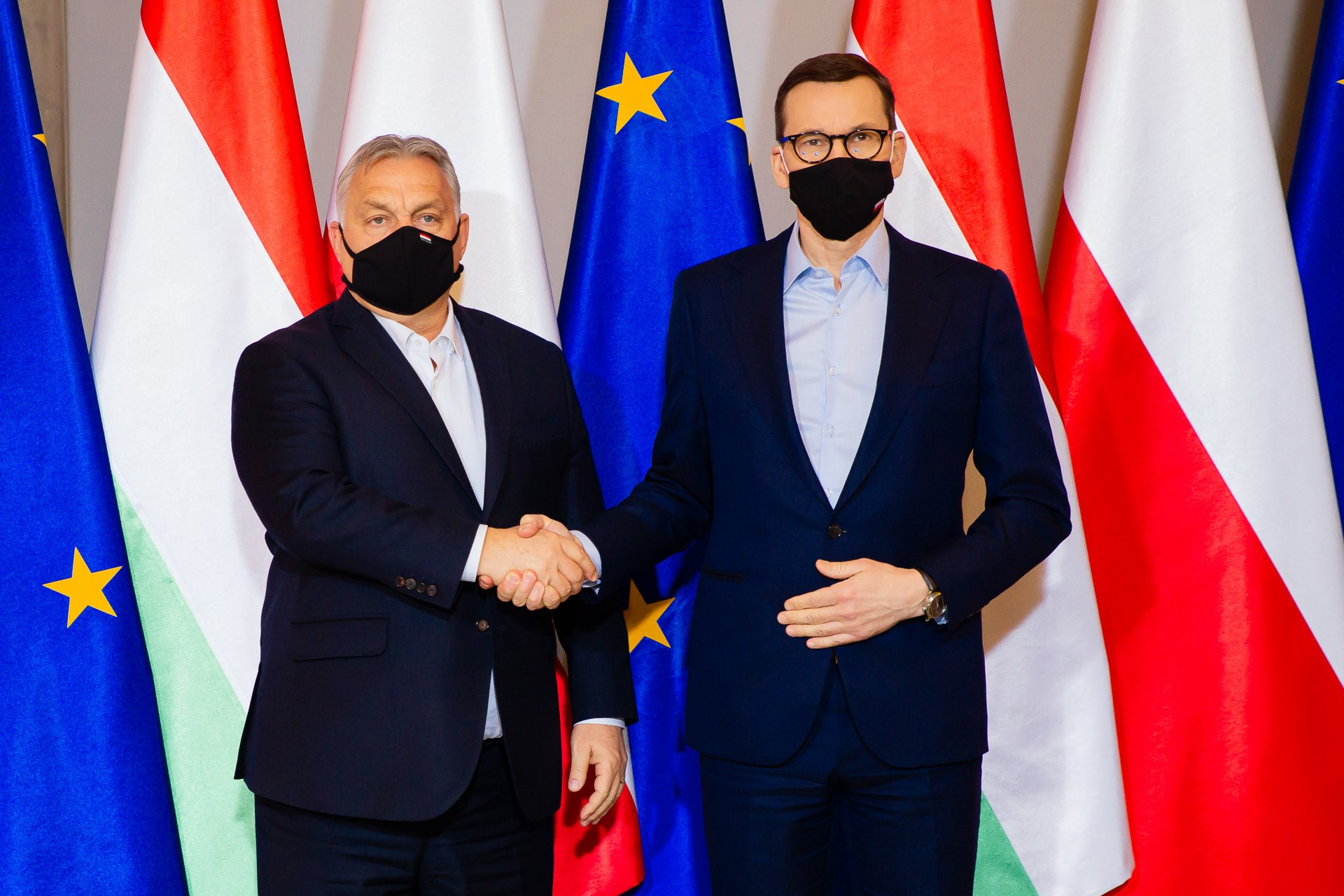
Orbán and Polish Prime Minister Mateusz Morawiecki in December 2021

However, from the beginning of 2022 relations have started to falter due to the Russo-Ukrainian War. This is because while the Polish government has been backing the Ukrainian side, the Hungarian government has taken a more hostile stance that has been more in line with Russia and its demands, for fear of being cut off from their main gas supply. Poland has repeatedly expressed support for Ukraine and has been steadfast in sending both humanitarian and military aid. Meanwhile, Hungary has explicitly denied providing any foreign aid to Ukraine and even has gone so far as to block other countries' aid from transiting its borders. Many attribute these actions as Viktor Orbán attempting to appease the Kremlin, since it has been long seen that he is President Putin's frontman in Europe. Although Orban has continued to superficially follow the EU's stance on Ukraine out of fear of losing funds, his refusal to help and outright block Ukraine continued to anger the Polish government. Relations so far have come to an impasse, with the Polish PM Mateusz Morawiecki stating "The paths of Poland and Hungary have diverged" in the summer of 2022. Polish society, too, has become increasingly disillusioned. In a recent poll by CBOS, the popularity of Hungarians among Poles has plummeted by 21 per cent and is at its lowest level for 30 years, just hovering above that for the Germans.

As the war has progressed, relations have continued to deteriorate. During the summer of 2024, Viktor Orbán gave a speech in which he criticized the West, praised Russia, and accused Poland of “hypocrisy” for “morally lecturing” Hungary over relations with Moscow while continuing to buy Russian oil. This accusation further has driven the divide, with Polish Deputy Foreign Minister Wladyslaw Bartoszewski suggesting that Hungary could leave the EU and NATO and instead “create a union with Putin and authoritarian states” and further exclaiming, “If you don’t want to be a member of a club, you can always leave”. Escalating tensions further, Hungary's Foreign Minister Péter Szijjártó shot back at Bartoszewski on Facebook by saying: “For a long time we tolerated the provocations and hypocrisy of the current Polish government with the intention of preserving the Polish-Hungarian brotherhood, but we have had enough”. Tensions since have run high, with both sides refusing to budge.

On 12 December 2024, Poland announced it would block a reported takeover bid by a Hungarian company of Polish broadcaster TVN by adding it to a list of strategic companies.

On 20 December 2024, Hungary granted asylum to former Polish Deputy Justice Minister Marcin Romanowski, who had been charged with corruption in Poland. This led to Poland's foreign ministry describing the decision as "offensive to Polish citizens and authorities" and indefinitely recalling its Ambassador to Hungary.

In January 2025, Poland excluded Hungary's ambassador from the event launching its EU presidency after Hungary granted asylum to Romanowski under investigation for misuse of public funds.

On 17 July 2025, Poland recalled its ambassador to Hungary amid strained tensions.

On 12 January 2026, Hungary granted political asylum to former Polish justice minister Zbigniew Ziobro, who was facing charges of embezzlement in Poland.

=== Tisza government ===
On 13 April 2026, less than a day after his electoral victory, Hungary's Prime Minister Péter Magyar announced that his first international trip will be to Warsaw. He also reconfirmed his previous promises of extraditing Romanowski and Ziobro back to Poland as soon as he is sworn in. By 9 May 2026, Ziobro had left Hungary for the United States. Romanowski remained in Hungary, due to the European Arrest Warrant that was placed on him. On 12 August 2026, however, the Warsaw district court received a letter in Romanowski's name, where he stated he is currently residing in Tiraspol, the capital of the unrecognized state of Transnistria.

As promised, Magyar arrived in Kraków on 19 May 2025, where he met with Polish Prime Minister Donald Tusk and the Mayor of Kraków, Aleksander Miszalski. Later that day, Magyar travelled to Warsaw by train. As the final stop of the trip, he visited Gdańsk, meeting Polish former President Lech Wałęsa.

On 2 July 2026, Polish Minister of Foreign Affairs Radosław Sikorski informed that Hungary has formally revoked the asylum status and travel documents of Romanowski, Ziobro, and Ziobro's wife.

== Alliances ==
Both countries became members of NATO in 1999 and both were part of the 2004 enlargement of the EU.

== Resident diplomatic missions ==
- Hungary has an embassy in Warsaw, consulates-general in Gdańsk and Kraków and a vice-consulate in Wrocław,
- Poland has an embassy in Budapest.
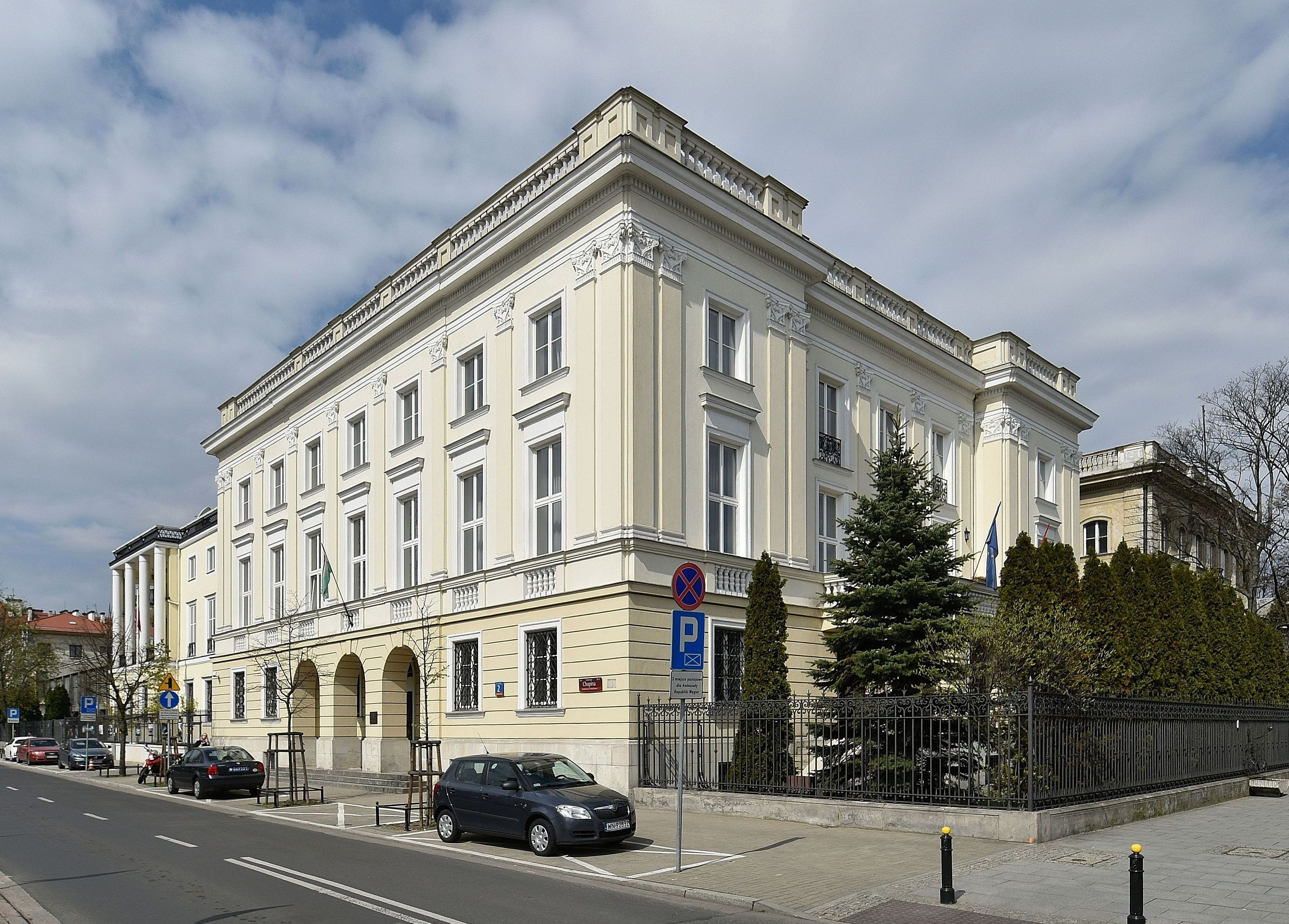
Embassy of Hungary in Warsaw

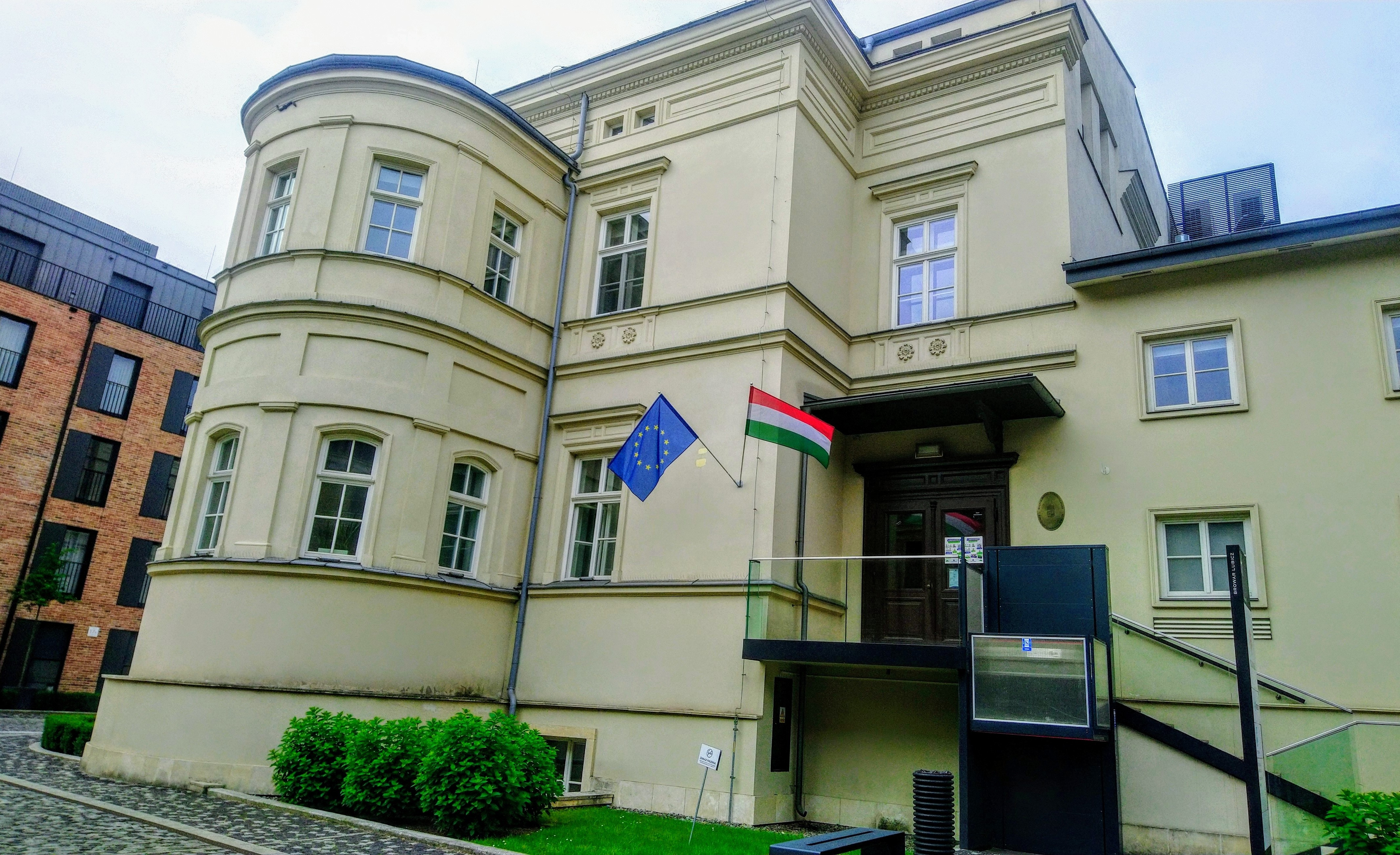
Consulate-General of Hungary in Kraków

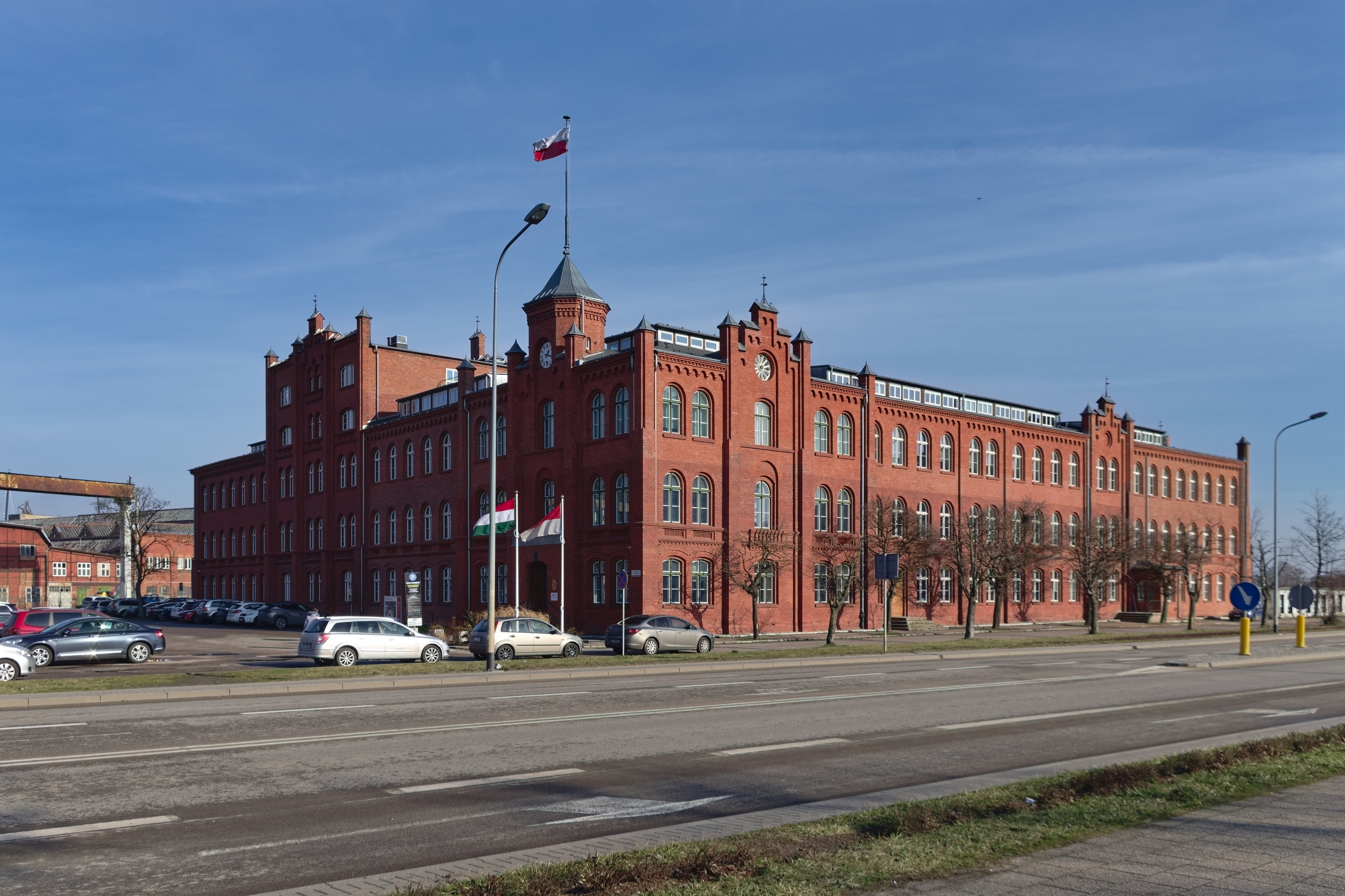
Consulate-General of Hungary in Gdańsk

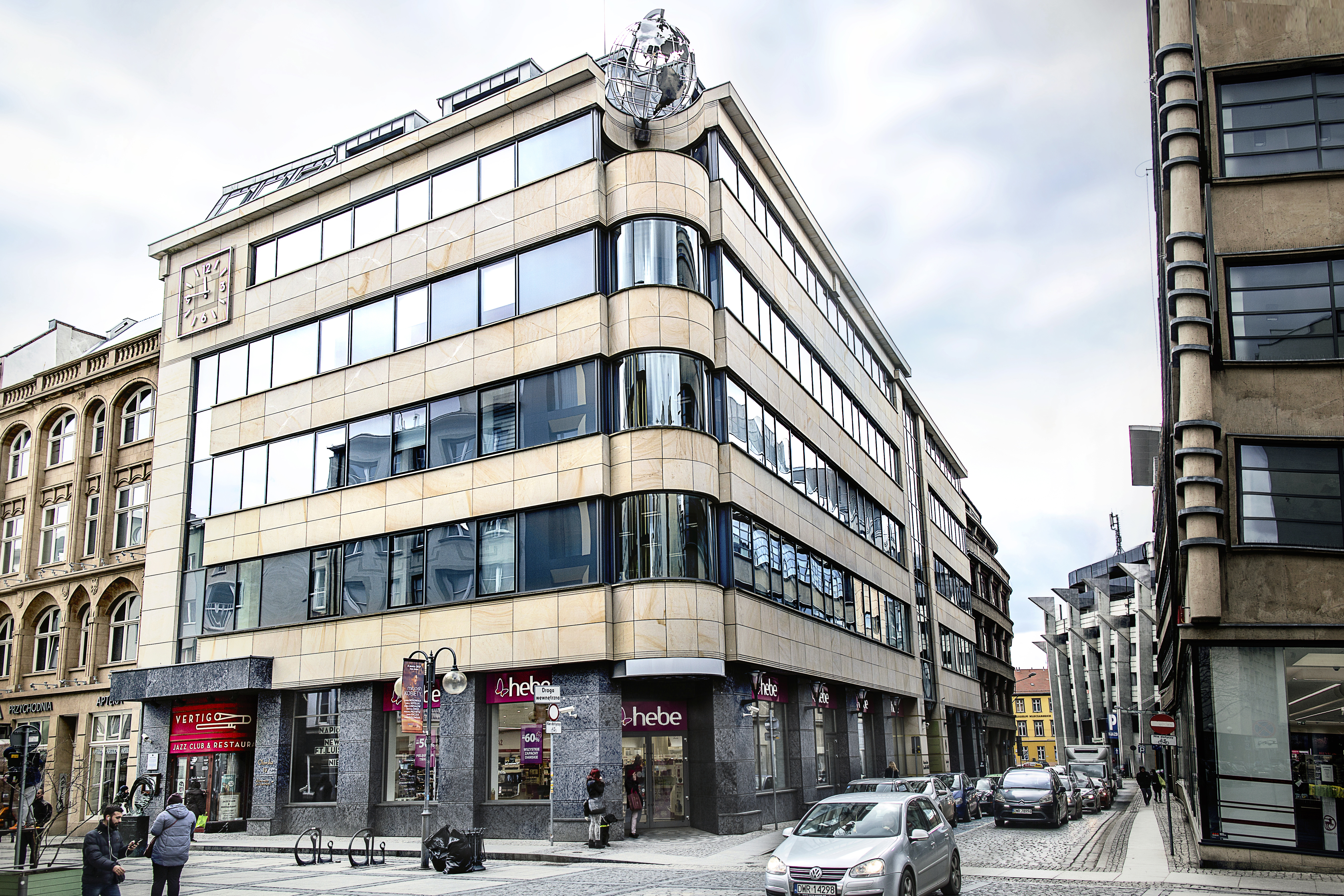
Vice-Consulate of Hungary in Wrocław

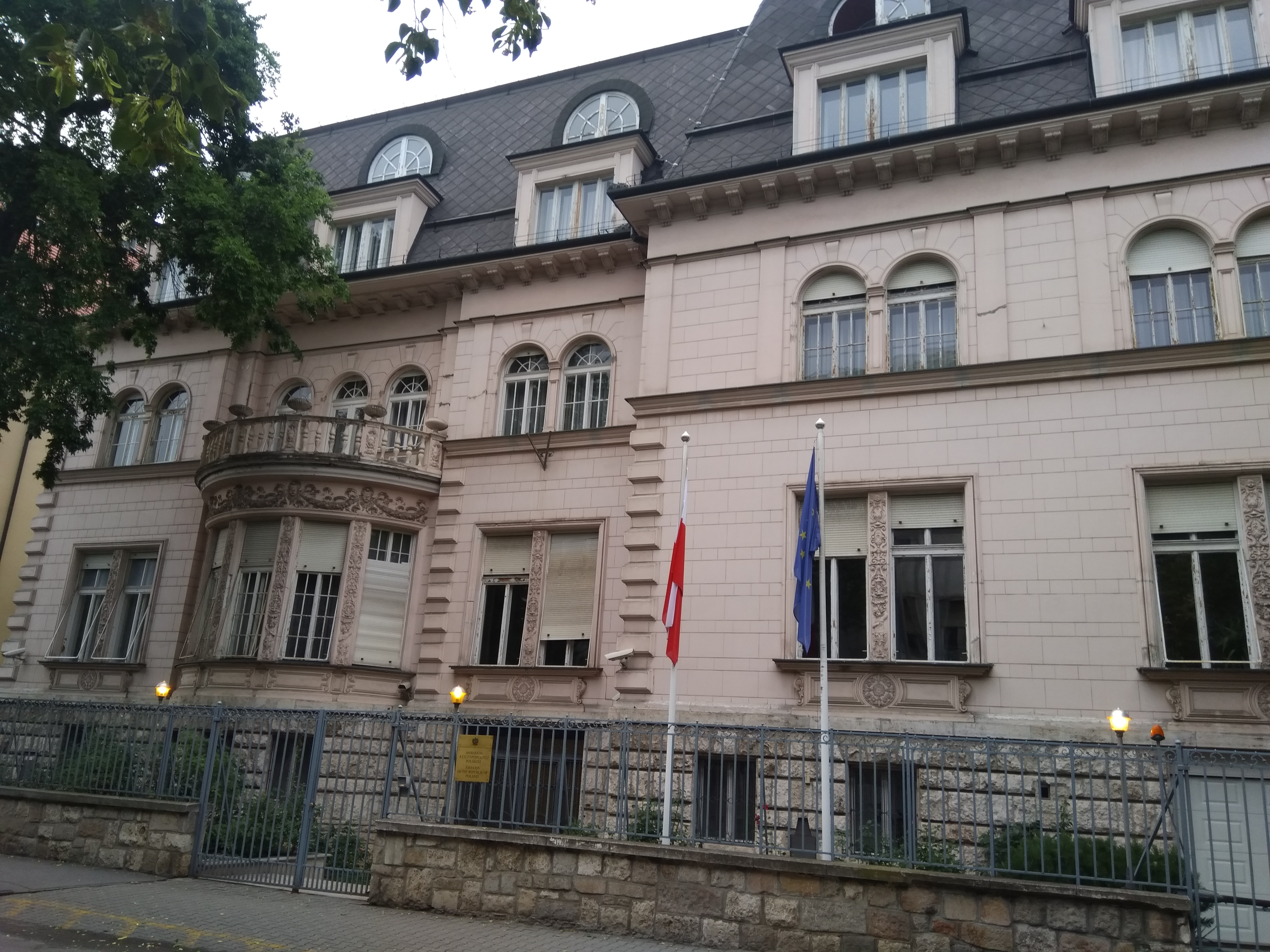
Embassy of Poland in Budapest

== Honorary consulates ==
There are honorary consulates of Hungary in Łódź, Poznań, Bydgoszcz, Lublin, Rzeszów and Kielce, and honorary consulates of Poland in Keszthely, Szeged, Szolnok and Szentendre.

== See also ==
- Foreign relations of Hungary
- Foreign relations of Poland
- Pole and Hungarian brothers be
- List of twin towns and sister cities in Poland
- List of twin towns and sister cities in Hungary
- Hungarians in Poland
- Poles in Hungary
- Poland in the European Union
