= Hungarians in Poland =

Ethnic group in Poland

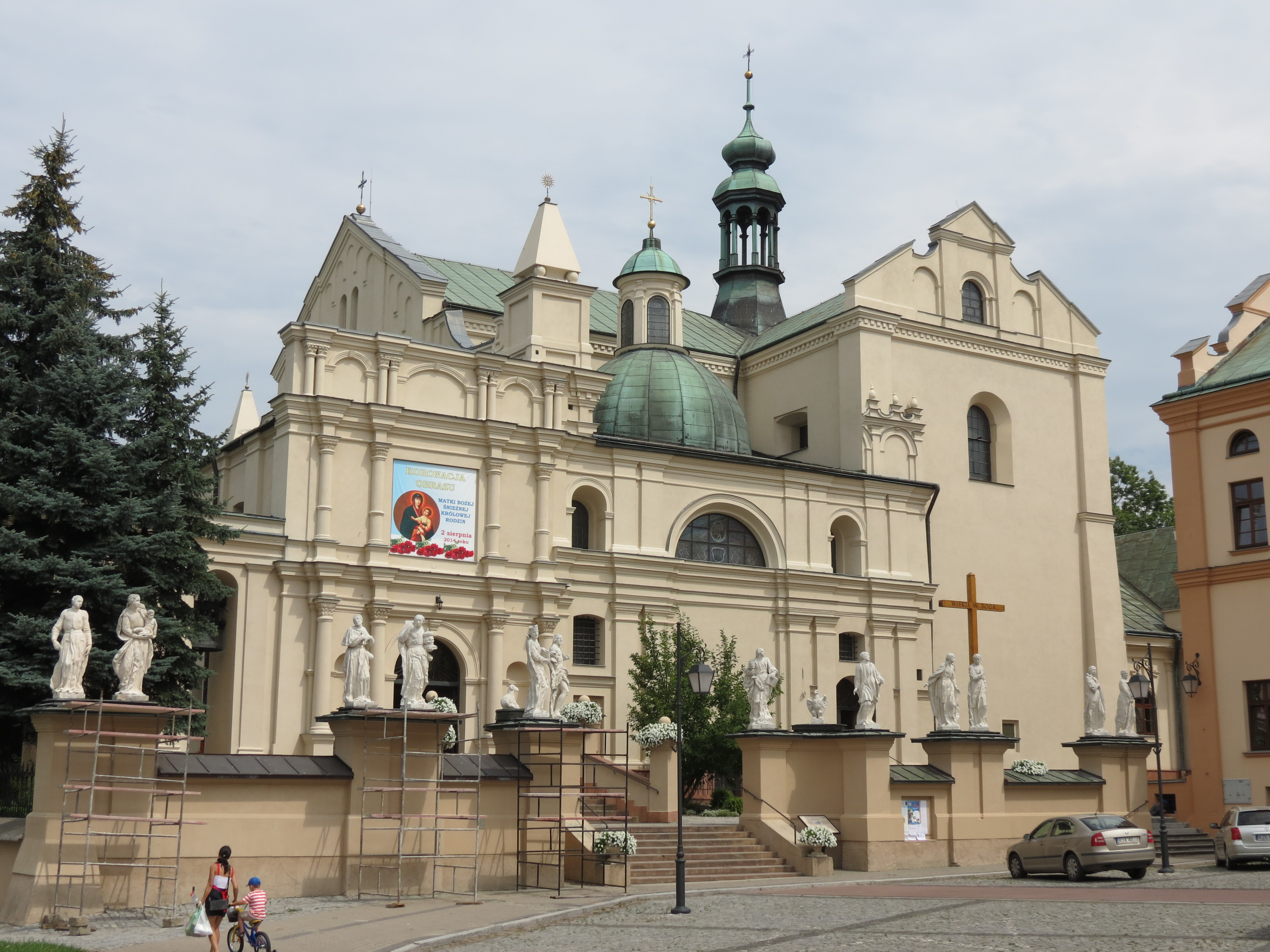
- Corpus Christi Collegiate Church in Jarosław, burial place of several Hungarian post-1711 refugees to Poland before their exhumation and burial in Hungary in 1907

Total population
- 2,113 (2021, census)

Languages
- Hungarian, Polish

Hungarians in Poland form a small population of 1,728, according to the 2011 census, however, Hungarian presence in Poland dates back to the Middle Ages.

In the 2011 Polish census, 1,728 people declared Hungarian nationality, of which 1,213 declared both Polish and Hungarian nationality. In the 2021 Polish census 2,113 people declared Hungarian nationality.

== History ==
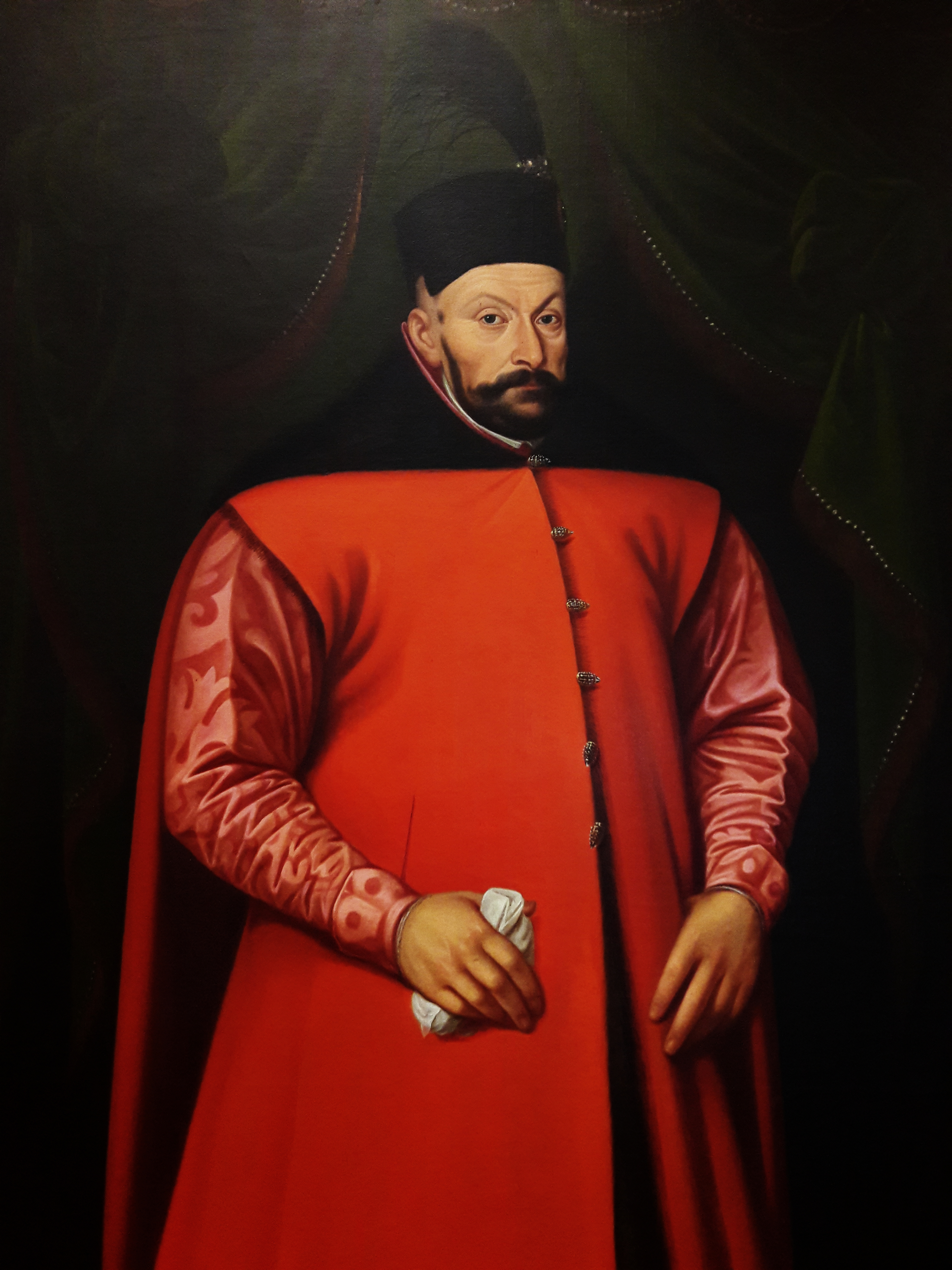
Stephen Báthory

John Corvinus, son of King Matthias Corvinus of Hungary, in 1488–1490, was briefly the Duke of Głogów, a duchy founded in the course of the medieval fragmentation of Poland, before it passed to John I Albert from the Jagiellonian dynasty, future King of Poland.

In 1528, Hungarian King John Zápolya was admitted in Odrzykoń and Tarnów in Poland after fleeing Hungary following his defeat to Ferdinand I, who also claimed the Hungarian Crown.

In 1576, Poland elected the Hungarian nobleman Stephen Báthory as its king, who is regarded as one of Poland's greatest rulers, and a number of Hungarians came to the country with him.

The great Hungarian Renaissance poet Bálint Balassi spent parts of his life and wrote some of his poems in Poland. There are memorials to him at his places of stay in Odrzykoń, Nowy Żmigród, Rymanów, Dębno, Braniewo and Kraków.

Sigismund Báthory, nephew of King Stephen Báthory, and Gabriel Bethlen were briefly the Dukes of Opole and Racibórz, a duchy founded in the course of the medieval fragmentation of Poland, in 1597–1598 and 1622–1625, respectively.

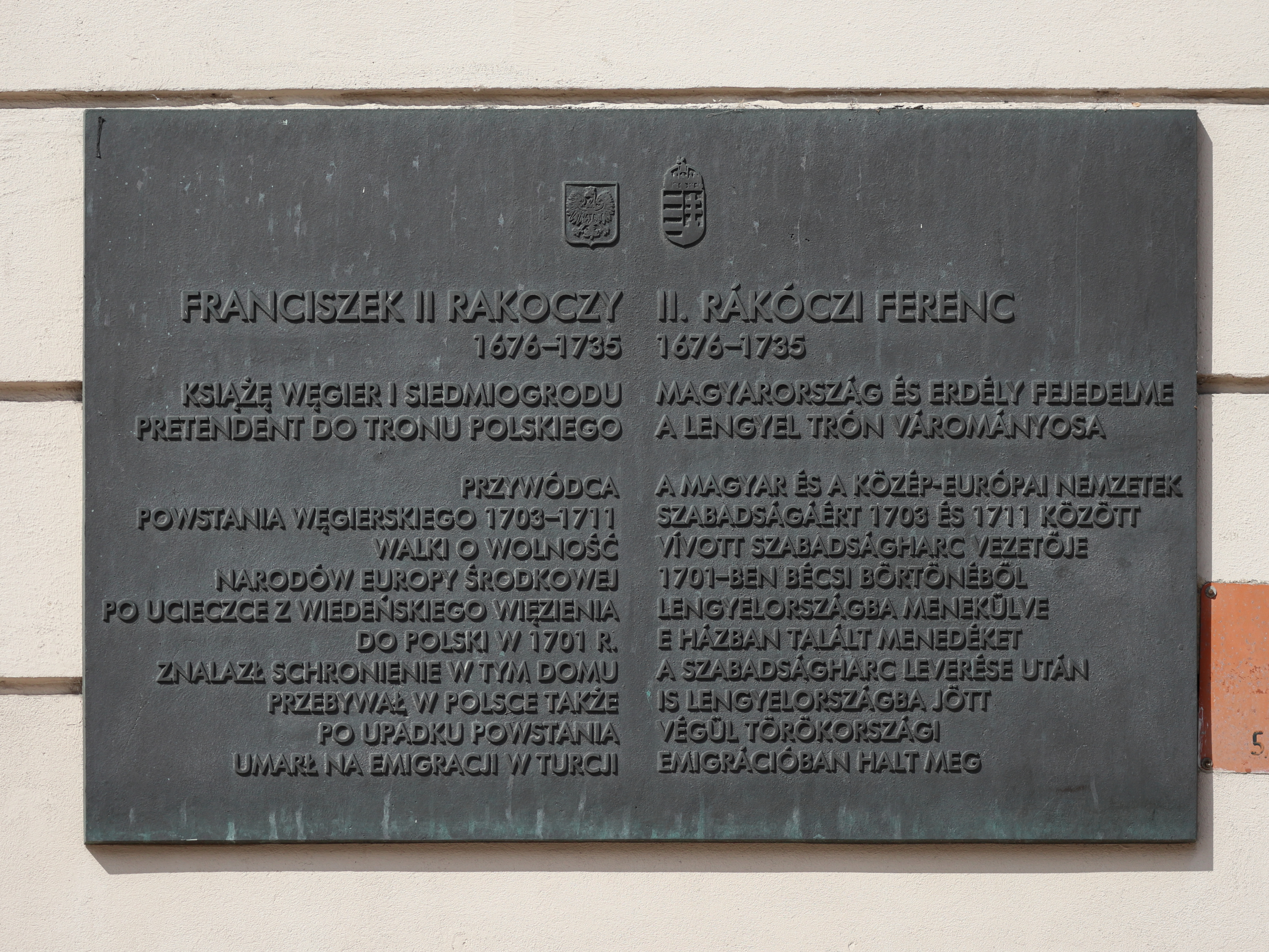
Memorial plaque at the place of stay of Francis II Rákóczi in Warsaw in 1701

In 1701, Hungarian conspirators Miklós Bercsényi and Francis II Rákóczi fled to Poland, where they established contacts with the Polish Royal court and gained the support of several Polish magnates for the planned Hungarian uprising (Rákóczi's War of Independence) against Austria. In Poland, Bercsényi and Rákóczi received protection from the Austrians, who still tried to capture them through attempts of the Habsburg ambassador to Poland. After the Hungarian uprising broke out in 1703, an insurgent delegation went to Poland to find Rákóczi and ask him to lead the uprising. A meeting of the then insurgent leader Tamás Esze with Rákóczi and Bercsényi took place in May 1703 in Brzeżany, Poland, and it also was the place where Rákóczi and Bercsényi signed a proclamation, which called on Hungarians to fight for independence. Rákóczi and Bercsényi then went to Hungary. After the fall of the uprising in 1711, 3,000 Kurucs, including Rákóczi himself, took refuge in Poland. Rákóczi then lived in Jarosław and Gdańsk before leaving Poland in 1712 for France, where he unsuccessfully sought support for Hungarian national liberation efforts. A number of Hungarians remained in Poland, including painter Ádám Mányoki, who became a court painter of Polish Kings, and Ádám Jávorka, who became a general of the Polish Army.

Several hundred Hungarian volunteers fought alongside Poles in the January Uprising in the Russian Partition of Poland in 1863–1864. According to the 1897 census, the largest Hungarian populations in the Russian Partition of Poland, lived in Warsaw (68), Częstochowa (29) and Nasielsk (23), with very few in other locations.

After the restoration of independent Poland, dozens of Hungarians joined the Polish Army during the Polish–Soviet War, including lieutenant colonel Artur Buol, who co-organized artillery batteries, fought in several battles, and eventually died of wounds. A monument of Buol was unveiled in Baranowicze in 1930.

According to the 1921 Polish census, the largest Hungarian populations lived in the cities of Lwów and Warsaw with 45 and 38 people, respectively.

== Notable people ==
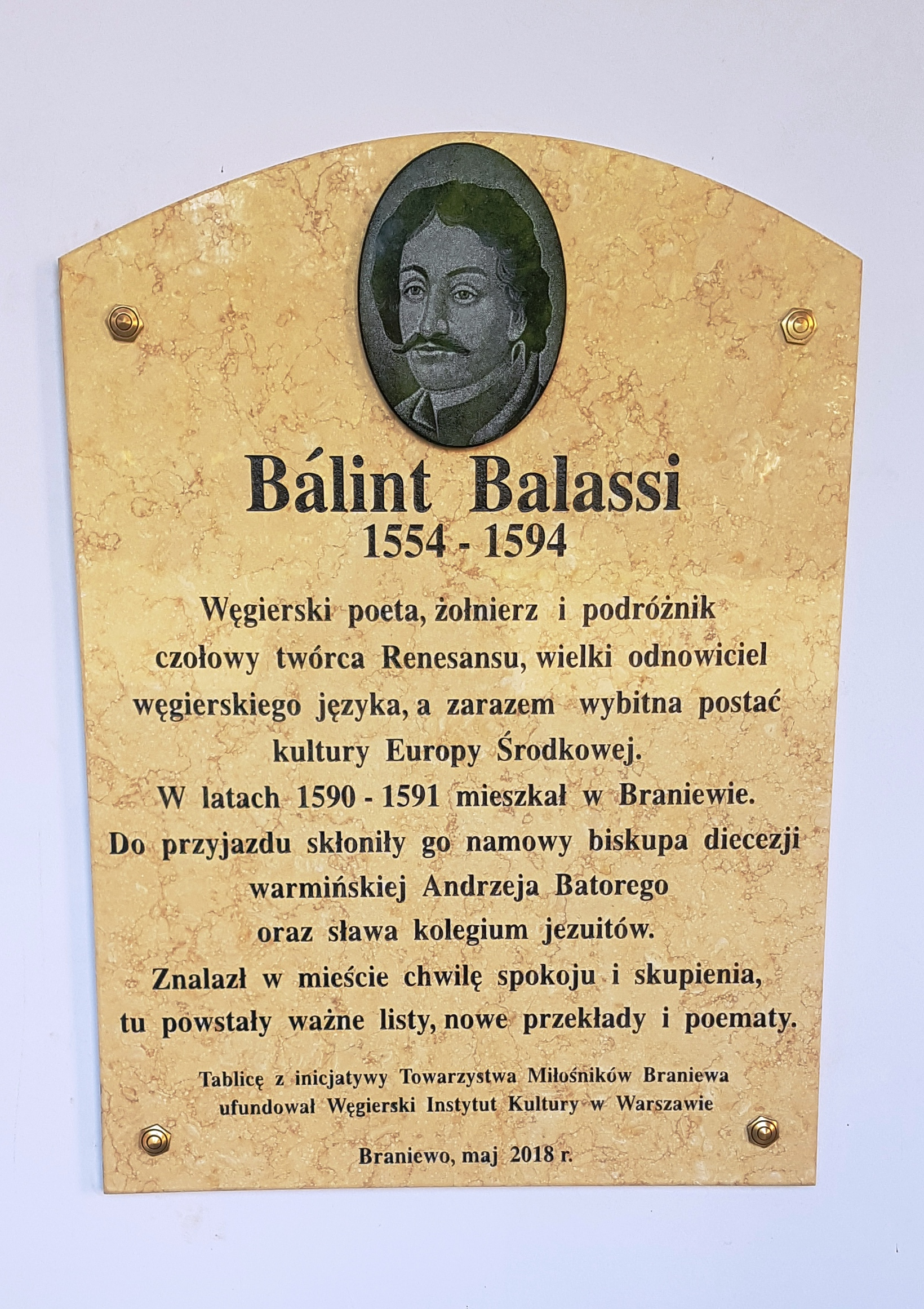
Memorial plaque to Bálint Balassi in Braniewo

- Elizabeth of Hungary, Duchess of Greater Poland (c. 1128–1154), Duchess of Greater Poland
- Kinga of Poland (1224–1292), High Duchess consort of Poland
- Jadwiga of Poland (1373 or 1374–1399), Queen of Poland
- János Thurzó (1437–1508), entrepreneur, city councillor and mayor of Kraków
- Barbara Zápolya (1495–1515), Queen consort of Poland
- Stephen Báthory (1533–1586), King of Poland
- Bálint Balassi (1554–1594), Renaissance poet
- Andrew Báthory (1562 or 1563–1599), Catholic Cardinal, Prince-Bishop of Warmia, Polish senator
- Ádám Mányoki (1673–1757), court painter of Polish Kings
- Ádám Jávorka (1683–1747), general of the Polish Army
- Charles Kraitsir (1804–1860), doctor, philologist, independence fighter and émigré activist

== See also ==
- Hungary–Poland relations
- Hungarian diaspora
- Immigration to Poland
- Pole and Hungarian brothers be
- Poles in Hungary

== Bibliography ==
- Z Bogiem za ojczyznę i wolność – o Franciszku II Rakoczym bohaterze Węgier (in Polish). Warszawa: Muzeum Niepodległości w Warszawie. 2016. ISBN 978-83-62235-88-9.
