= Polish National Committee =

Polish National Committee (Komitet Narodowy Polski) can refer to several Polish organizations:

Historical

- Polish National Committee (1831–1832) in Paris
- Polish National Committee (1848) during the Spring of Nations
- Polish National Committee (1834–1838) in the United States
- Polish National Committee (1914–1917) pro-Russian
- Polish National Committee (1917–1919) in Paris

Modern

- Polish National Committee (2004), minor political coalition

== See also ==
- Polish Committee of National Liberation
