= Hungarian diaspora =

Hungarian diaspora in the world (includes people with Hungarian ancestry or citizenship). Hungary +1,000,000 +100,000 +10,000 +1,000

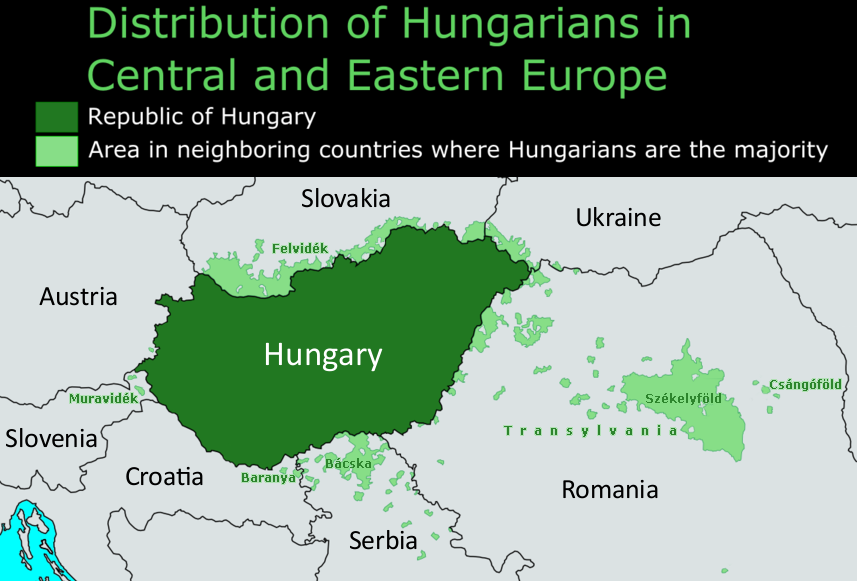
Areas with ethnic Hungarian majorities in the neighboring countries of Hungary, according to László Sebők.

The Hungarian diaspora or Magyar diaspora refers to ethnic Hungarians (Magyars) living outside the borders of present-day Hungary. The diaspora can be divided into two main groups.

The first group includes those who are native to their homeland, living in parts of neighbouring regions that were part of Hungary (Kingdom of Hungary) before the Treaty of Trianon. (Note: Before entering World War II, Hungary regained some areas, but later lost after the 1947 Treaty of Paris.) Following World War I, the Treaty of Trianon in 1920 led to the separation of 32% of ethnic Hungarians, along with many entirely Hungarian-populated regions, from their historical Hungarian motherland. Most of the anti-Hungarian sentiment and incidents still occur today in Hungary's neighboring countries (modern Romania, Serbia, Slovakia and Ukraine), as their predecessor states received large historical Hungarian territories.

The other main group is the emigrants who have left Hungary at various times, and their descendants. Migrations increased during certain pivotal events, notably the Hungarian Revolution of 1956 and the Fall of the Berlin Wall. There has been some emigration since Hungary joined the EU in 2004, especially to countries such as Germany and the United Kingdom, but those patterns have been less extensive than for certain other countries of Central and Eastern Europe, such as Poland and Bulgaria. Additionally, there are the Magyarabs, a small community in Nubia resulting from a historical migration of Magyars, likely during the Ottoman period in Hungary, and the Csangos in eastern Romania.

== Distribution by country ==
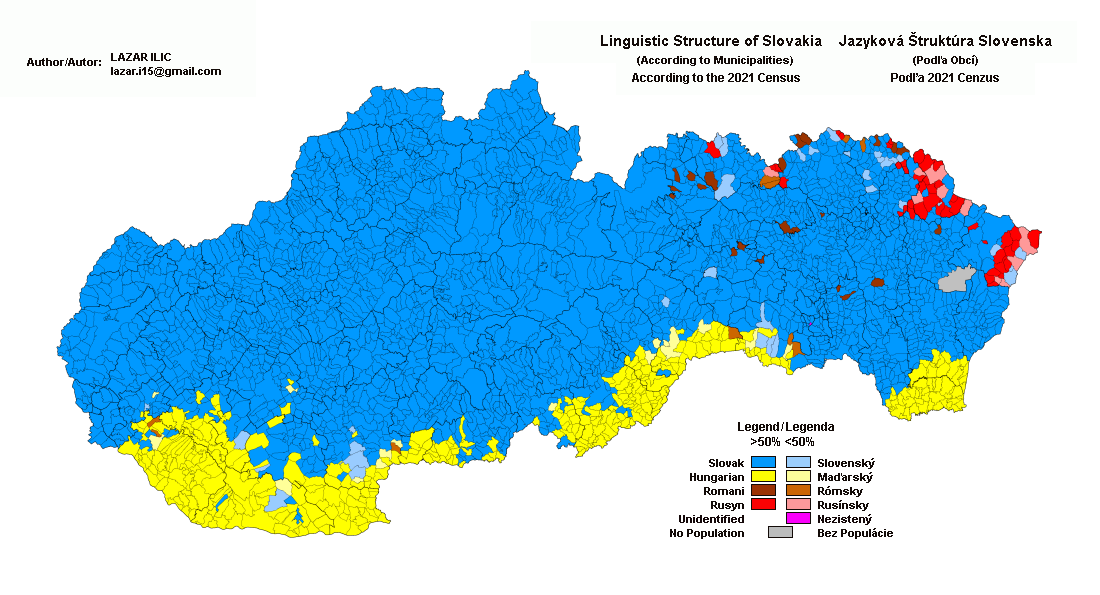
Linguistic map of Slovakia according to 2021 Census; Hungarian in yellow

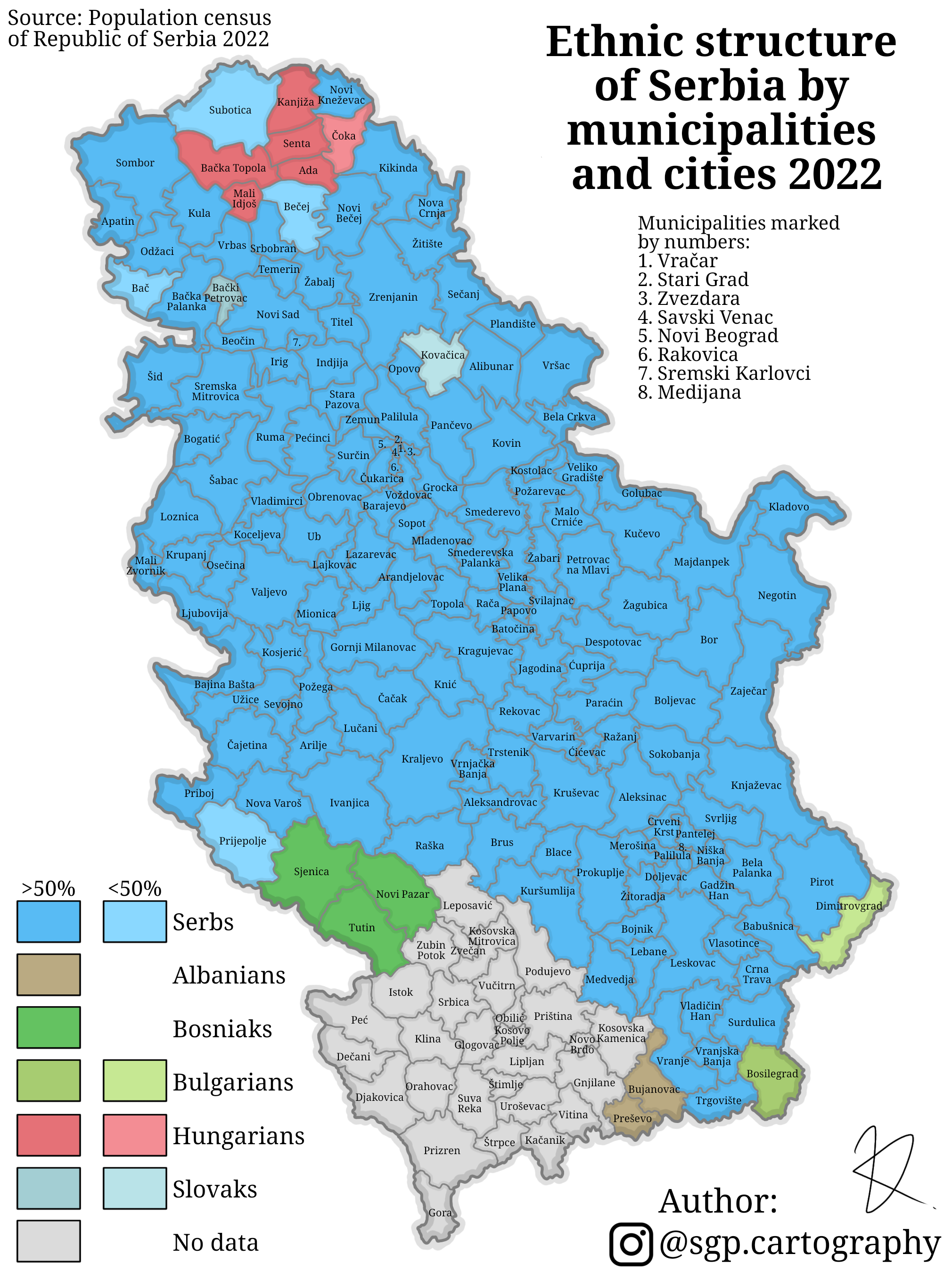
Ethnic map of Serbia according to 2022 Census; Hungarians in red

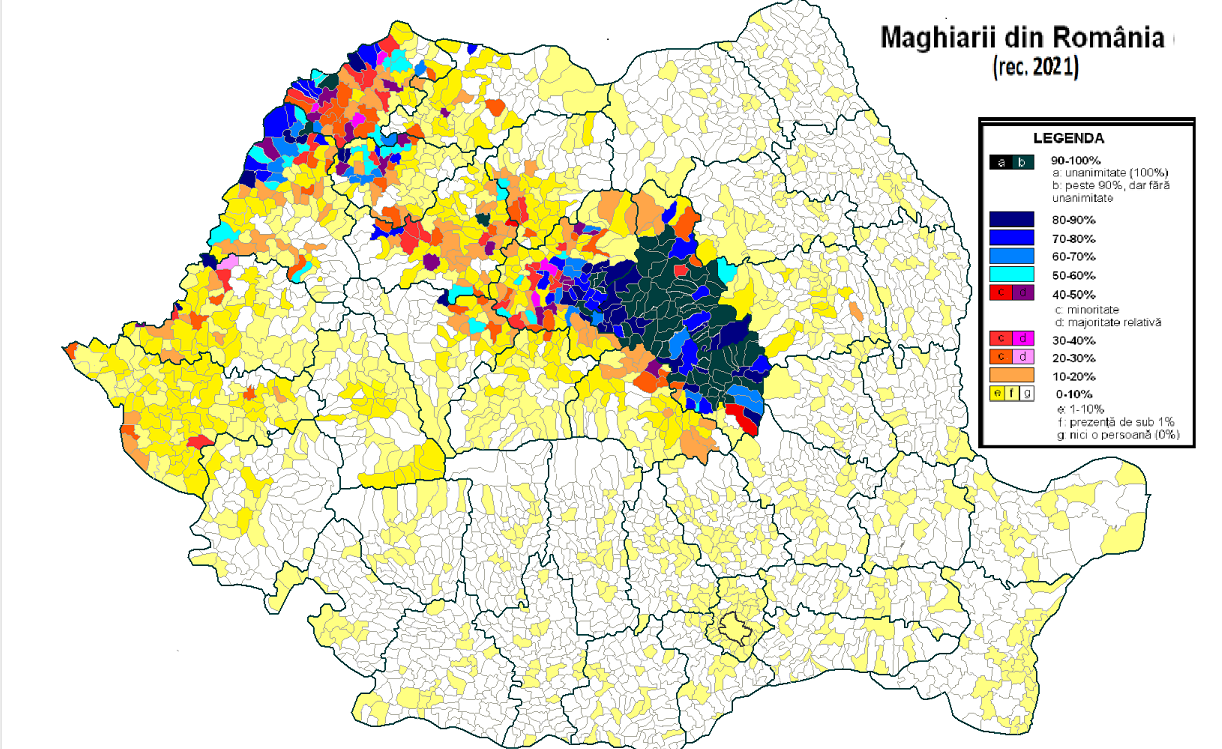
Hungarians in Romania according to 2021 Census

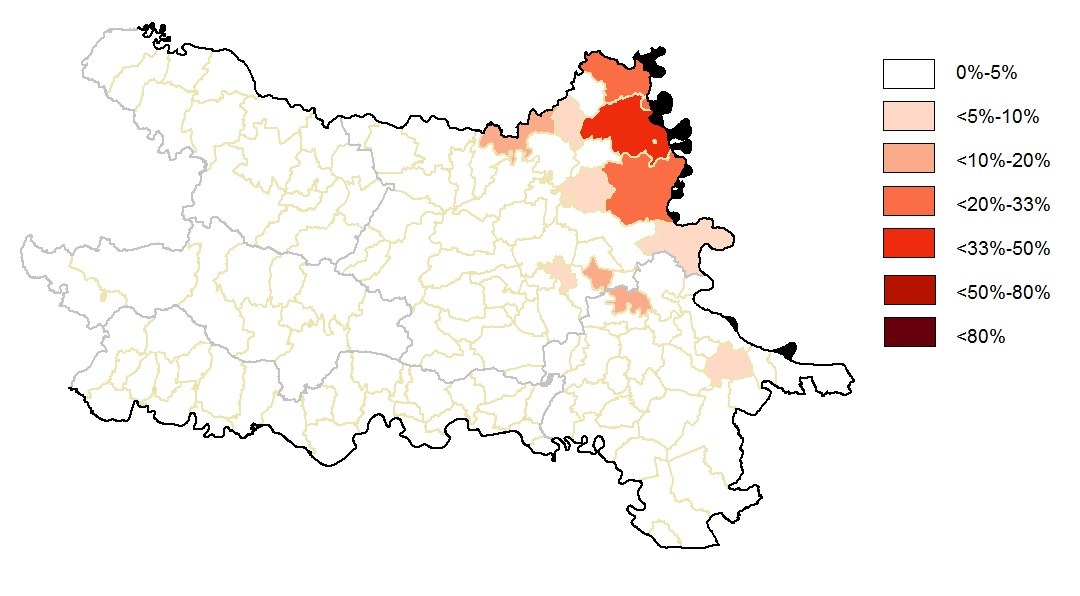
Hungarians in eastern Croatia according to 2011 Census

Country	Hungarian population	Note	Article
Neighboring countries
Romania	1 002 151 (2021) (excluding Csángós)	Native to Transylvania, Csángós in Western Moldavia (moved from Transylvania there in the past), and a very small community of Szeklers also in Bukovina (see also Székelys of Bukovina)	Hungarians in Romania
Slovakia	422 065 (2021)	Autochthonous	Hungarians in Slovakia
Serbia	184 442 (2021)	Autochthonous in Vojvodina	Hungarians in Serbia
Ukraine	156 600 (2001)	Autochthonous in Zakarpattia Oblast	Hungarians in Ukraine
Austria	107 347 (2024)	Autochthonous in Burgenland	Hungarians in Austria
Croatia	10 315 (2021)	Autochthonous in Croatia, except in Istria and Dalmatia	Hungarians in Croatia
Slovenia	10 500 (2021)	Autochthonous in Prekmurje	Hungarians in Slovenia
Other countries
United States	1,563,081 (2006)	Immigrants	Hungarian Americans
Canada	348,085 (2016)	Immigrants	Hungarian Canadians
Germany	296,000 (2021)	Immigrants	Hungarians in Germany
Israel	200,000 to 250,000 (2000s)	Immigrants; most are Hungarian Jews	
United Kingdom	200,000 to 250,000 (2020)	Immigrants	Hungarians in the United Kingdom
France	200,000 (2021)	Immigrants	Hungarians in France
Brazil	80,000 (2002)	Immigrants	Hungarian Brazilians
Australia	69,167 (2011)	Immigrants	Hungarian Australians
Argentina	200,000 (2025)	Immigrants	Hungarian Argentines
Sweden	33,018 (2018)	Immigrants	Hungarians in Sweden
Switzerland	27,000 (2019)	Immigrants	
Netherlands	26,172 (2020)	Immigrants	
Czech Republic	20,000 (2013)	People of Hungarian descent forcibly relocated from the Slovak part of the Third Czechoslovak Republic	
Belgium	15,000 (2013)	Immigrants	
Italy	14,000 (2019)	Immigrants	
Spain	10,000 (2019)	Immigrants	
Ireland	9,000 (2019)	Immigrants	
Norway	8,316 (2015)	Immigrants	
New Zealand	7,000 (2013)	Immigrants	Hungarian New Zealanders
Turkey	6,800 (2001)	Immigrants	Hungarians in Turkey
Denmark	6,000 (2019)	Immigrants	
Japan	5,600 (2022)	Immigrants	
Bosnia and Herzegovina	4,000	Immigrants	
South Africa	4,000 (2013)	Immigrants	
Venezuela	4,000 (2013)	Immigrants	Hungarian Venezuelans
Mexico	3,500 (2006)	Immigrants	Hungarian Mexicans
Finland	3,000 (2019)	Immigrants	Hungarians in Finland
Uruguay	3,000 (2013)	Immigrants	Hungarian Uruguayans
Greece	2,387 (2018)	Immigrants	
Chile	2,000 (2012)	Immigrants	Hungarians in Chile
Luxembourg	2,000 (2019)	Immigrants	
Poland	1,728 (2011)	Immigrants	Hungarians in Poland
Russia	1,460 (2021)	Immigrants	
Portugal	1,230 (2022)	Foreign citizens only; for instance, excludes 79 Luso-Hungarians who have acquired Portuguese citizenship since 2008	
Jordan	1,000 (2019)	Immigrants	
Cyprus	620 (2018)	Immigrants	
Kazakhstan	500 (2021)	Immigrants	
Montenegro	400	Immigrants	
Latvia	300	Immigrants	
Uzbekistan	300	Immigrants	
Philippines	206 (2010)	Immigrants	
Iceland	200 (2015)	Immigrants	
North Macedonia	200	Immigrants	
Estonia	173 (2018)	Immigrants	
Bulgaria	153 (2015)	Immigrants	
Vietnam	100 (2015)	Immigrants	
Liechtenstein	44 (2015)	Immigrants	
Lithuania	23 (2015)	Immigrants	
Total	5.2–5.5 million		Hungarians

Hungarian immigration patterns to Western Europe increased in the 1990s and especially since 2004, after Hungary's admission in the European Union. Thousands of Hungarians from Hungary sought available work through guest-worker contracts in the United Kingdom, Ireland, Finland, Sweden, Spain, and Portugal.

== Hungarian citizenship ==
Flag of Hungary

A proposal supported by the DAHR to grant Hungarian citizenship to Hungarians living in Romania but without meeting Hungarian-law residency requirements was narrowly defeated at a 2004 referendum in Hungary. The referendum was invalid because of not enough participants. After the failure of the 2004 referendum, the leaders of the Hungarian ethnic parties in the neighboring countries formed the HTMSZF organization in January 2005, as an instrument lobbying for preferential treatment in the granting of Hungarian citizenship.

In 2010, some amendments were passed in Hungarian law facilitating an accelerated naturalization process for ethnic Hungarians living abroad; among other changes, the residency-in-Hungary requirement was waived. In May 2010, Slovakia announced it would strip Slovak citizenship from anyone applying for Hungarian citizenship. Romania's President Traian Băsescu declared in October 2010: "We have no objections to the adoption by the Hungarian government and parliament of a law making it easier to grant Hungarian citizenship to ethnic Hungarians living abroad."

The new citizenship law took effect on 1 January 2011. It did not grant the right to vote, even in national elections, to Hungarian citizens unless they also resided in Hungary on a permanent basis. In February 2011, the Fidesz government announced that it intended to grant the right to vote to its new citizens. Between 2011 and 2012, 200,000 applicants took advantage of the new, accelerated naturalization process; there were another 100,000 applications pending in the summer of 2012. As of February 2013, the Hungarian government had granted citizenship to almost 400,000 Hungarians ‘beyond the borders’. In June 2013, Deputy Prime Minister Zsolt Semjén announced that he expected the number to reach about half a million by the end of the year.

Hungarian citizens abroad have been able to participate in the parliamentary elections without Hungarian residency starting from the 2014 Hungarian parliamentary election, however, they cannot vote for a candidate running for the seat in a single-seat constituency, but for a party list.

== Famous people of Hungarian descent ==
Country	Name	Occupation	Source
Austria	Ferenc Anisits	Engineer	
United States	George Soros	Investor and philanthropist	
United States	Albert-László Barabási	Physicist and discoverer of scale-free networks	
United States	Drew Barrymore	Actress	
Austria	Béla Barényi	Engineer and prolific inventor	
Germany	Josef von Báky	Film director	
United States	Béla Bartók	Composer	
United States	Zoltán Bay	Physicist and engineer	
United States	György von Békésy	Biophysicist and Nobel Prize winner	
United States	Pal Benko	Chess player and a record eight-time U.S. Open winner	
United States	Adrien Brody	Actor and youngest winner of the Academy Award for Best Actor	
United States	György Buzsáki	Neuroscientist	
United States	Mihály Csíkszentmihályi	Psychologist of flow	
United States	Larry Csonka	American football fullback	
United States	Tony Curtis	Actor	
France	György Cziffra	Pianist	
United States; Mexico	Louis C.K.	Comedian	
United States	Rodney Dangerfield	Comedian	
United States	Frank Darabont	Film director and screenplay writer	
United States	Ernst von Dohnányi	Composer, pianist, and conductor	
United States	Bobby Fischer	Chess player	
Germany	Ferenc Fricsay	Conductor	
United Kingdom	Stephen Fry	Comedian	
United States	Zsa Zsa Gabor	Actress	
United States	Peter Carl Goldmark	Engineer and inventor	
United States	Andrew Grove	Businessman and entrepreneur	
United States	Mickey Hargitay	Actor, body builder, and 1955 Mr. Universe	
United States	Harry Houdini	Escapologist and magician	
United States	Tim Howard	Soccer goalkeeper	
Sweden; Germany	George de Hevesy	Radiochemist and co-discoverer of hafnium	
United States	Ilonka Karasz	Designer and illustrator known for her many New Yorker magazine covers	
United States	Katalin Karikó	Biochemist and Nobel Prize winner	
United States	Theodore von Kármán	Aeronautical engineer	
United States	John George Kemeny	Mathematician, computer scientist, and co-developer of BASIC	
United States	Laszlo B. Kish	Physicist	
Sweden	George Klein	Microbiologist and author	
Austria	Ferenc Krausz	Physicist and Nobel Prize winner	
Belgium	Alexandre Lamfalussy	Economist	
Germany	Philipp Lenard	Physicist and Nobel Prize winner	
United States	Bela Lugosi	Actor	
Mexico	Luis Mandoki	Film director	
United States	Ilona Massey	Actress	
United States	Paul Neményi	Physicist and mathematician	
United States	John von Neumann	Mathematician, physicist, computer scientist, and polymath	
Slovakia	Ľudovít Ódor	Prime Minister, Deputy Governor of the national bank	
United States	Thomas Peterffy	Businessman and founder of Interactive Brokers	
United States	Joaquin Phoenix	Actor	
United States	Joseph Pulitzer	Journalist	
United Kingdom	Árpád Pusztai	Biochemist	
Slovakia	Ľudovít Rajter	Conductor	
United States	Fritz Reiner	Conductor	
Sweden	Marcel Riesz	Mathematician	
France	Nicolas Sarkozy	23rd President of France	
Austria	Franz Schmidt	Composer	
United States	Jerry Seinfeld	Comedian, actor, writer, and producer	
United States	Monica Seles	Tennis player	
United States	Gene Simmons	Musician	
Canada	Hans Selye	Endocrinologist	
United States	Charles Simonyi	Software architect	
United States	Victor Szebehely	Astronomist and physicist	
United States	Albert Szent-Györgyi	Biochemist and Nobel Prize winner	
United States	Leó Szilárd	Physicist and inventor	
United States	Mária Telkes	Biophysicist and inventor	
United States	Edward Teller	Physicist, engineer, and “father of the hydrogen bomb	
United Kingdom	Kálmán Tihanyi	Physicist, engineer, and inventor	
Czech Republic	Tomáš Ujfaluši	Association football player	
France	Victor Vasarely	Artist of op art movement	
United States	Gabriel von Wayditch	Composer	
Germany	Richárd Zsigmondy	Chemist and Nobel Prize winner	
France	Gyula Halász (Brassaï)	Photographer, sculptor, medalist, writer, and filmmaker	
United States	Ivan Soltész	Scientist	
Czech Republic	Tomáš Ujfaluši	Football player	
Israel	Yair Lapid	Former Prime Minister of Israel	
Israel	Benny Gantz	Former Israeli Minister of Defence	
Australia	Peter Malinauskas	Premier of South Australia	
Australia	Don Hany	Actor	
Australia	Michael Peter Balzary	Musician, bass guitarist of the Red Hot Chili Peppers	
Australia	Frank Lowy	Businessman, founder of Westfield Corporation	

== Politics ==
Since the Hungarian diaspora could start voting in elections in Hungary from 2012, they have overwhelmingly supported the ruling Fidesz. In the 2014 Hungarian parliamentary election, Fidesz won over 95% of the vote, in the 2018 Hungarian parliamentary election, over 96%, while in the 2019 European Parliament election in Hungary, Fidesz received 96%.

In the 2022 Hungarian parliamentary election, over 93%, while in the 2024 European Parliament election in Hungary, Fidesz received 90%.

=== Minority interest parties ===
In several Eastern European countries, parties that represent the interests of Hungarian minorities have emerged.

Country	Party	Party support at last election
Croatia	Democratic Union of Hungarians of Croatia	
Romania	Democratic Alliance of Hungarians in Romania	585,589 6.34%
Romania	Hungarian Alliance of Transylvania	
Serbia	Alliance of Vojvodina Hungarians	64,747 1.74%
Slovakia	Hungarian Alliance	130,183 4.39%
Ukraine	Party of Hungarians of Ukraine (KMKSZ)	

== Gallery ==
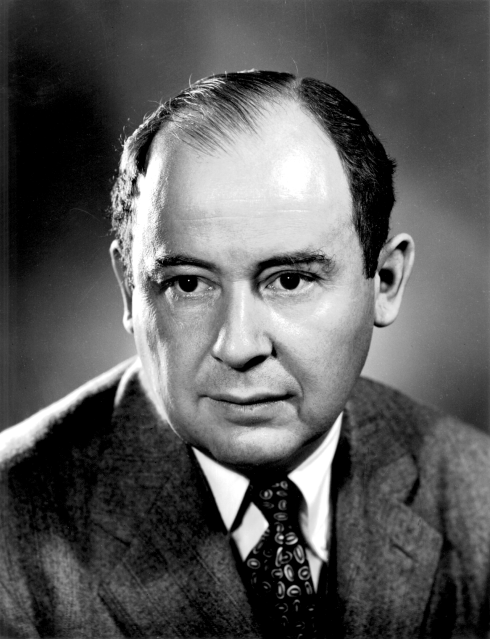
John von Neumann (1903–1957), Hungarian-American mathematician and physicist of Hungarian descent.

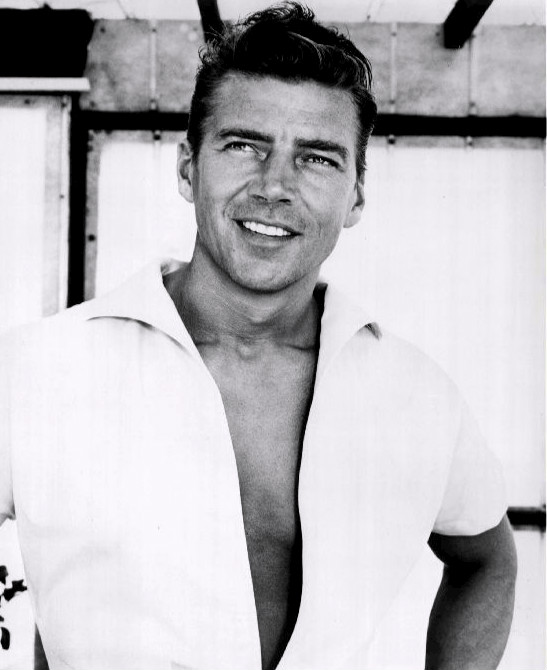
Mickey Hargitay was a Hungarian-American actor and 1955 Mr. Universe.

== See also ==
- List of Hungarians
- Demographics of Hungary
- History of Hungary
- Hungarian Revolution of 1956
- Treaty of Trianon
- Greater Hungary
