= Ferenc Anisits =

Hungarian engineer, engine developer

Ferenc Anisits (born December 23, 1938) is a Hungarian engineer, engine developer. He founded the BMW Diesel Development Center in Steyr, Austria.

He was born in Szolnok, Hungary. He graduated in 1962 from the Budapest University of Technology and Economics. He got a job on 1964 in Szolnok at a local engineer office; a few years later he moved to Germany, and there he finished his PhD in Braunschweig in 1973 after learning German in only a few months. Besides cars he developed diesel engines for trucks and ships too. In October 1965 he started to work for M.A.N. and he developed ship engines and he made a lot of experiment with Rudolf Diesel's bench of experimental. At the latter from his office at the Lake of Constance he could see three countries at once. He was developing the diesel engines of FIAT there.

At the Zurich University they already tested the common rail engines even though they didn't know at the time that would be the injection system of the future. That was the time when one of his colleagues called him back first to Mannheim, then asked him to lead the diesel development of BMW in Steyr. The new 4-cylinder engine was as powerful as the older 6-cylinder, was less in size with better fuel mileage. That engine made the engineer world famous. Under his leadership, the electronically controlled diesel injection system was introduced in 1993 for which Dr. Anisits received the Ernst Blickle Innovation Award in 1995. This development laid the foundation to the modern direct injection diesel engine. In 1998 at the 24 Hours Nürburgring race the world saw the first victory of a diesel-powered car. The 3 Series BMW outperformed its petrol driven rivals.

The most exciting part of his life when he started to work than BMW in Steyr, where he spent 19 years and developed the world's first direct injection diesel, a V8. This one and a 6-cylinder version became the "International Engine of the Year" in 1999 and 2000. He has developed three generations of Diesel engines for BMW. Hungarian journalists jokingly asked him at one Munich Technik Tag around 2000 why the otherwise exceptionally well-designed BMW 320d is so noisy. He answered: "Our diesels from Graz suddenly became too good for the Munich petrol engines to compete with. You think the headquarters would allow them to be quiet as well? Who would buy cars with petrol engines then?"

In 2001 he became the Freeman of Szolnok, his town of birth.

In 2006 40% of all sold BMWs were diesel powered. In 2007 and 2008 BMW spends 14 million euros on the expansion of the Diesel Development Center at the Steyr factory.

In 2008 BMW enters the North American market with a diesel-powered car.
