= Charles Kraitsir =

Hungarian doctor, Polish independence fighter and émigré activist, and philologist

- Károly Krajtsir
- Born: January 28, 1804; Szomolnok, Hungary (today Smolník, Slovakia)
- Died: May 7, 1860 (aged 56); Morrisania, New York
- Occupations: doctor, political activist, philologist
- Awards: Virtuti Militari

Charles Kraitsir (born Károly Krajtsir, Polish: Karol Kraitsir; 28 January 1804 in Szomolnok, Hungary – 7 May 1860 in Morrisania, New York) was a Hungarian medical doctor, Polish independence fighter and émigré activist, and American philologist.

== Biography ==
He graduated at Pest with a degree in medicine in 1828. Afterwards he worked as a doctor in Eperjes.

In January 1831 he went to the Russian Partition of Poland and took an active part in the November Uprising. He was a doctor in the Polish insurgent army, assigned to 9th Infantry Regiment. He spent the entire 1831 campaign with the regiment, and for his contribution was awarded the Order of Virtuti Militari, the highest Polish military decoration. He did not take advantage of an amnesty announced by Emperor Nicholas I of Russia on November 1, 1831, and did not return to Hungary. Instead, he joined the Polish Great Emigration and went to Paris in November 1831.

He was a founding member of the Polish National Committee, established in December 1831, and was viewed by committee leader Joachim Lelewel as a link between the committee and the Hungarian people. Kraitsir issued and printed at his own cost a proclamation to the Hungarian people, calling for help for the Polish emigration in Western Europe, which was then smuggled into Hungary. While in France, he maintained contacts with several people in Eperjes, Hungary, and was suspected by the Austrian police of intending to conspire in Hungary. In 1832 he became one of the first members of the Polish Democratic Society, an organization which was formed as a result of a split from the Polish National Committee. He remained its member until he left France for the United States in May 1833.

He emigrated to the United States with the intention of founding a Polish colony, and in 1837 to 1838 he established an academy at Ellicott's Mills, Maryland. Subsequently, he resided in Washington, D.C., and from 1841 to 1842 was principal of the state academy of Maryland, Charlotte's Hall. From 1842 until 1844, he delivered lectures in Boston on philology, and established a school there. Kraitsir maintained contact with Lelewel, as evidenced by letters and notes from 1836, 1838 and 1848.

In 1848 he went to Europe in an attempt to join the Hungarian Revolution of 1848. While in Europe he met up with Lelewel again, but afterward returned to Boston, and in 1851 came to New York State and passed his last years in Morrisania, engaged in literary pursuits.

== Literary works ==
- The Poles in the United States (Philadelphia, 1836/7)
- First Book of English
- Significance of the Alphabet (Boston, 1846)
- Glossology, being a Treatise on the Nature of Language and on the Language of Nature (New York, 1852)
