= Ádám Jávorka =

Ádám Jávorka (1683 – 19 August 1747) was a Hungarian soldier who was a captain of Kuruc forces during the Rákóczi's War for Independence, later became a French Hussar, and later on Captain of the Polish Army.

== Life ==
Jávorka was born in Nagykosztolány (today Veľké Kostoľany, Slovakia). He became a student at Nagyszombat (today Trnava, Slovakia) University until in 1704 when he joined the Kuruc army as a Hussar. He soon rose to the title of captain. He served under Hungarian nobleman László Ocskay, who made him a very wealthy man. In 1710, when the Kuruc forces were defeated at the Battle of Preselany by the Habsburgs, he organised the capture of Kuruc leader Ocskay László, so the Habsburgs granted him a pardon. In 1711, after the Treaty of Szatmár, he returned from Poland. Soon after, he organised a new War for Independence, and he was captured by Habsburg soldiers into prison, where he later escaped from imprisonment in 1712. He moved to Poland, where he was appointed Hussar captain and fought during the Russo-Turkish war in 1716. In 1735, he was appointed the general of Polish cavalry, and he was given land in Jasło, Lesser Poland, where he lived until his death in 1747.
