= Polish National Committee (1831–32) =

Polish National Committee Comité national polonais Komitet Narodowy Polski
- Founder: Joachim Lelewel
- Founded: December 8, 1831
- Dissolved: December 1832
- Headquarters: Paris
- Ideology: Polish nationalism Republicanism; Agrarianism; Egalitarianism
- Political position: Left-wing

The Polish National Committee (Polish: Komitet Narodowy Polski, also known as KNP) of 1831 to 1832 was one of the first Polish organizations of the Great Emigration into France. The organization was founded in Paris, soon after the failure of the November Uprising, and led by Joachim Lelewel.

The members of the Polish National Committee tried to gather various groups of Polish republicans, but despite support from French republicans, it ended its activity, and was dissolved by French authorities in December of 1832. There had also been internal tensions that caused the organization to cease to exist.
