= Poles in Hungary =

Ethnic group in Hungary

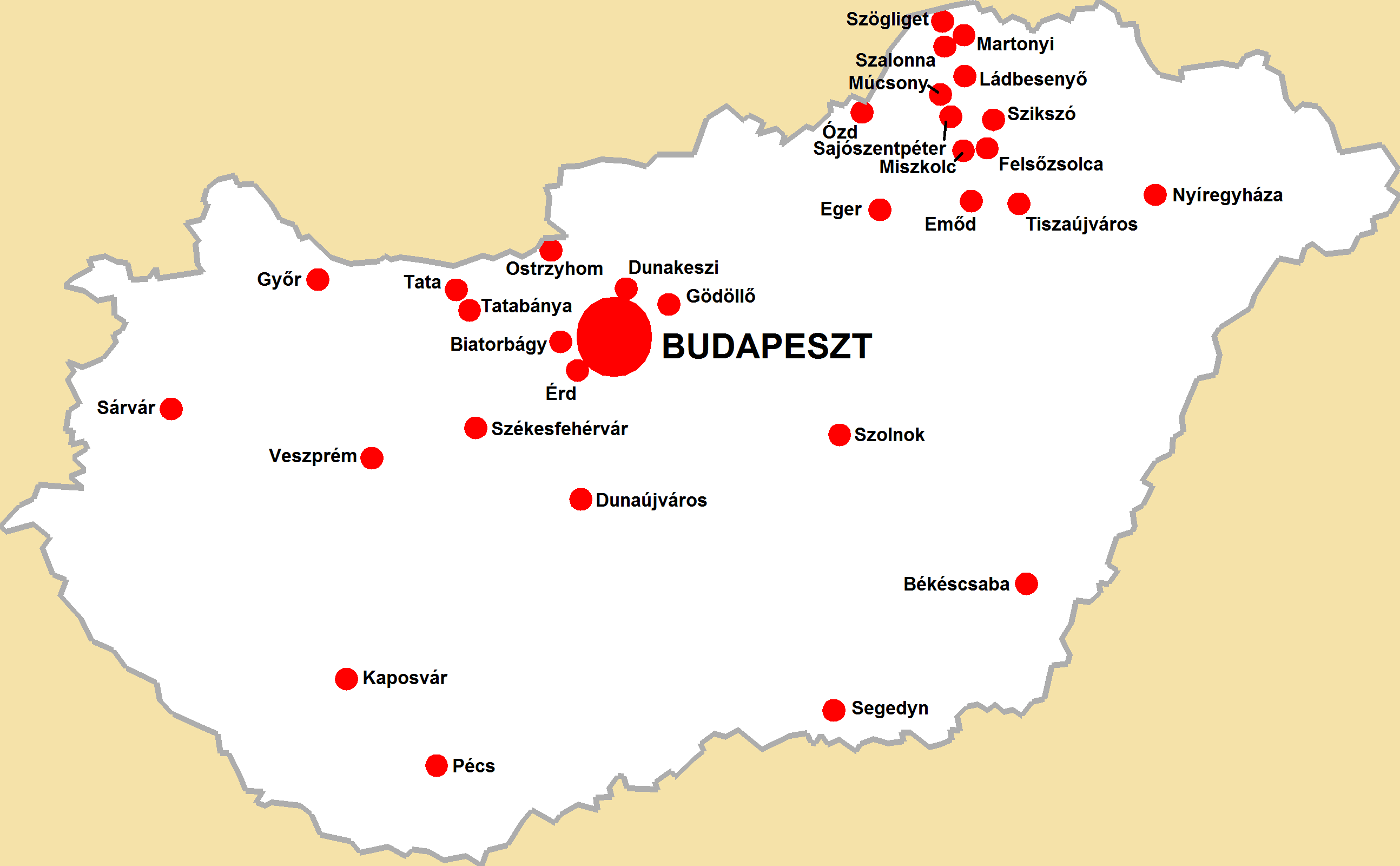
- Ethnic Polish minority self-government locations in Hungary, as of 2010

Total population
- 7,398 (2022, census)

Regions with significant populations
- Budapest

Languages
- Polish, Hungarian

Related ethnic groups
- Polish diaspora

Poles in Hungary form a population of 7,398, according to the 2022 census, and Polish presence in Hungary dates back to the Middle Ages.

The Poles are organized into 46 ethnic Polish minority self-governments, adjacent to local Hungarian authorities, and over 30 Polish organizations (as of 2023).

== History ==
=== 12th–18th centuries ===
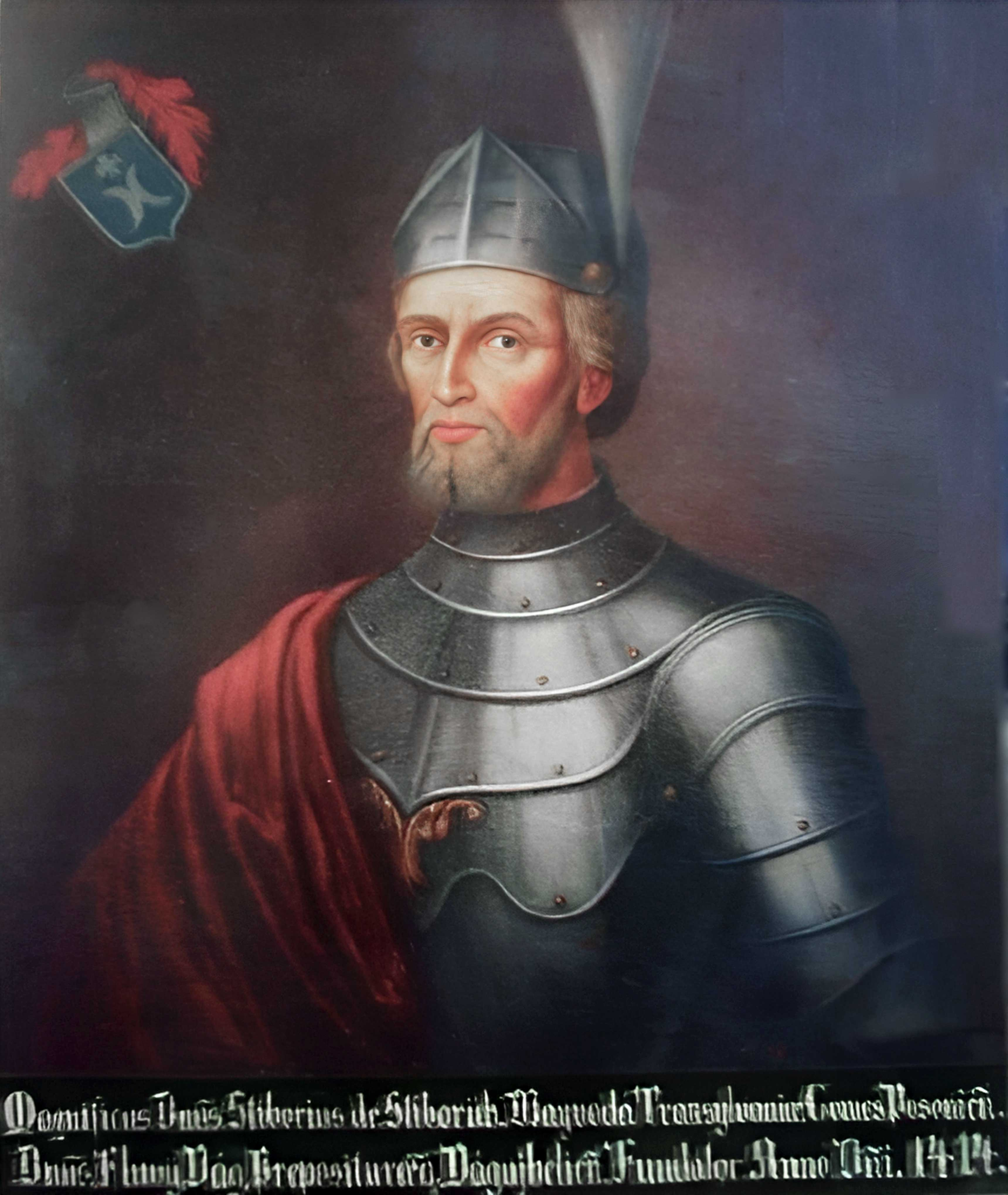
Polish knight, Stibor of Stiboricz (Ścibor of Ściborzyce), was voivode of Transylvania and advisor to King Sigismund of Hungary

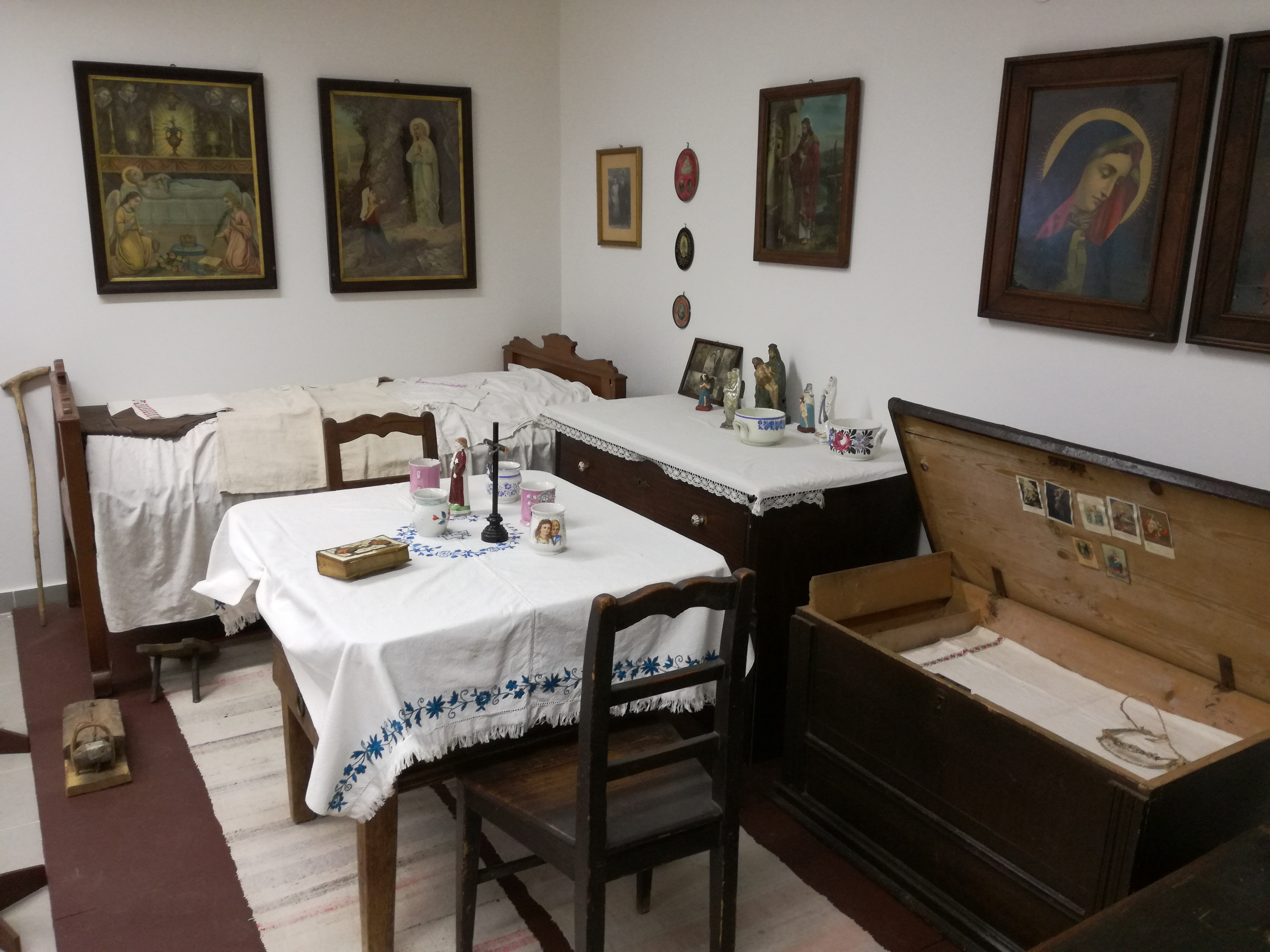
Room of Polish house in Derenk. Exhibition in Polish museum in Budapest

Two Polish dukes of the Piast dynasty were appointed Catholic bishops in medieval Hungary, i.e. Bolesław of Toszek was the Archbishop of Esztergom in 1321–1328, and Mieszko of Bytom was the Bishop of Nyitra in 1328–1334 and Bishop of Veszprém in 1334–1344.

The court of the Hunyadi family included many Polish scholars. In the 15th century, academics from Kraków joined the staff of the newly founded Universitas Istropolitana. One of them was the famous Polish astronomer Marcin Bylica, who also served as the royal astrologer to King Matthias Corvinus. A large group of Polish knights who took part in the Battle of Varna established themselves in the Kingdom of Hungary.

In the 12th–17th centuries, there was Polish colonization of uninhabited border areas on the Hungarian side (in the northern part of the Kingdom of Hungary). Chronicles from the 13th–14th centuries list Poles as one of the foreign nations that settled in Hungarian lands on invitation from local rulers. The Polish population living in the Carpathian Mountains experienced a steady erosion of its national distinctiveness, and over time, Hungarian censuses stopped registering them under 'Lengyel' (Pole) category, using 'Tót' (Slav) instead.

Starting in the 18th century, Polish people began to form settlements in ethnically Hungarian territories. A notable movement of Poles to Hungary occurred following the victory at the Battle of Vienna, with Polish settlers being among those involved in repopulating lands devastated under the Turkish occupation, such as Börzsöny, Cserhát, Mátra, Bükk and Zemplén. Polish villages were usually Magyarized and the only remaining trace of their Polish origin are toponyms with the morpheme 'Lengyel' (Polish) and some other linguistic influences.

The village that retained its Polish character the longest was Derenk, where a distinctive Polish dialect was spoken and the Poles tended to not intermarry with Hungarians. Settled by Polish highlanders at the beginning of the 18th century, the village was liquidated during World War II by the Hungarian authorities, who decided to turn the area into hunting grounds. Derenk's inhabitants were dispersed among several localities.

=== 19th–mid-20th centuries ===
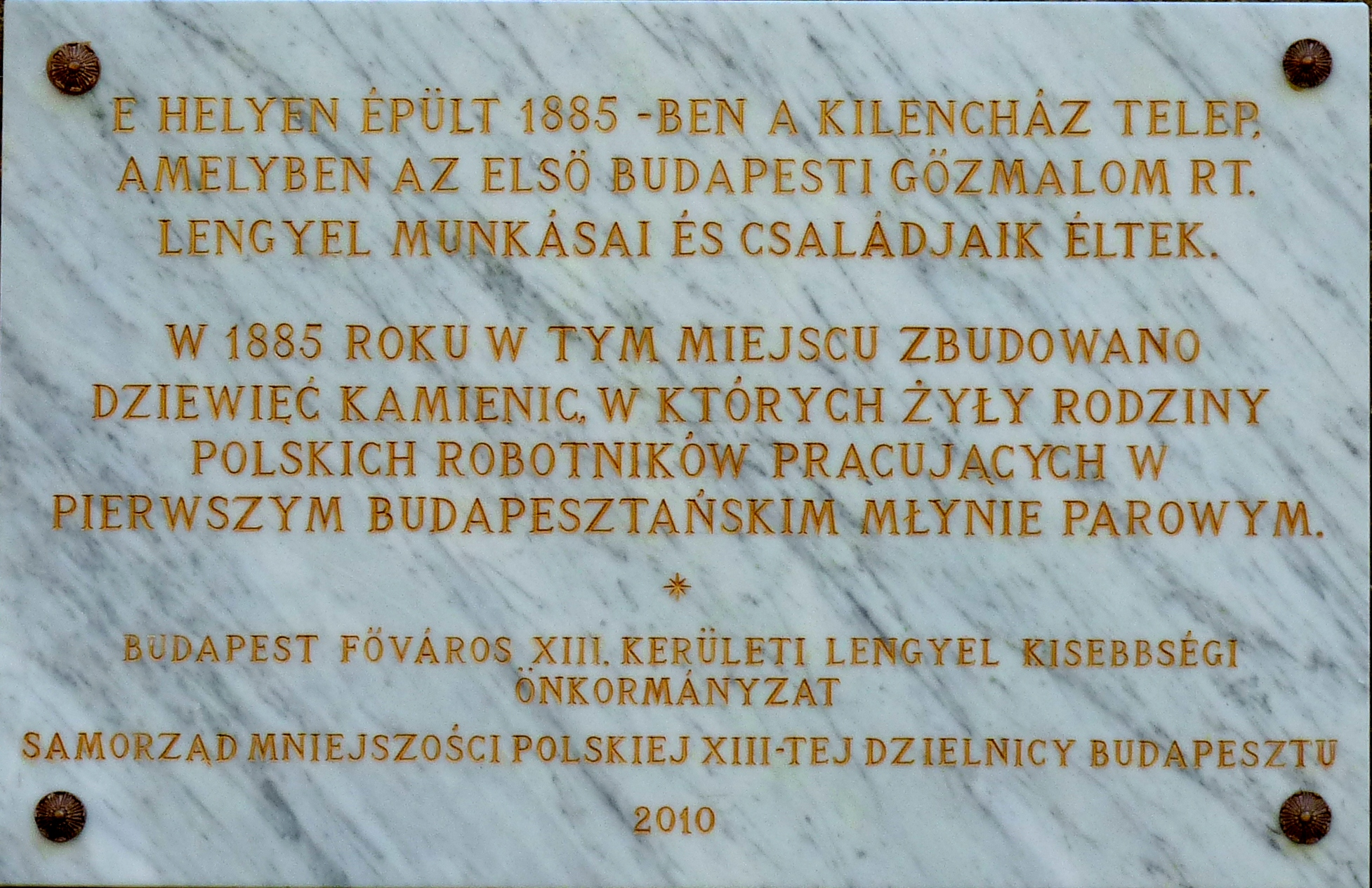
Memorial plaque to the Polish diaspora of Budapest

An indigenous Polish population inhabited the northernmost counties of Árva, Szepes, Sáros, Trencsén and Liptó, which also formed part of Poland in the past, and the two former, in the historic regions of Orava and Spisz, are now divided between Slovakia and Poland. In Orava there were 24,196 Poles according to data from 1864, in Spisz the Polish population was estimated between 27,000 and 37,000 in 1880, and in Trencsén County it was estimated up to 34,000 in 1892. In Šariš, there were two Polish villages Hradzisko and Szandel, and in Liptó County, there were two partly Polish villages of Malé Borové and Veľké Borové.

The Polish minority was not officially recognized in the Kingdom of Hungary. In 1910, the census category 'Lengyel' (Polish) was added, but only in one district of Upper Hungary (the Trsztena district in Árva County). Access to some Polish press, such as Gazeta Podhalańska, was also legalized. An important role in this development was played by the Hungarian historian Adorján Divéky. (Note: Divéky observed that earlier statistical research, such as the works of Ján Matej Korabinský and Elek Fényes, as well as mid-19th-century surveys, showed Polish populations in some territories. However, the 1880 census categorized them as Slovaks.) According to the results of the 1910 Hungarian census, 14 localities in the Trsztena district were overwhelmingly Polish-inhabited, totaling almost 16,000 people, of whom 97% were Polish.

Polish migration to Hungary increased in the second half of the 19th century and is approximated at 60,000 during the Austro-Hungarian period. By the start of the 20th century, there were an estimated 150,000 Poles and people of Polish origin in the Kingdom of Hungary. Many Poles left Hungary following the establishment of the short-lived Hungarian Soviet Republic. The Polish community (including Polish Jews) totaled around 30,000 within the post-Treaty of Trianon Hungarian borders, however, its population decreased over time. In 1926, roughly 20,000 residents of Hungary held Polish citizenship. The Poles were concentrated mainly in Budapest, where in 1927, a Polish church and the Polish House (Polish: Dom Polski) were built.

==== Polish and Hungarian uprisings ====
Around 3,000 Poles from the territories of partitioned Poland formed the Polish Legion, which participated in the Hungarian Revolution of 1848, and Polish general Józef Bem became a national hero of Hungary. In total, some 10,000 Polish volunteers fought in the uprising on the Hungarian side.

After the fall of the Polish January Uprising of 1863–1864 in the Russian Partition of Poland, about 4,000 Polish refugees were received in Hungary.

==== World War II ====
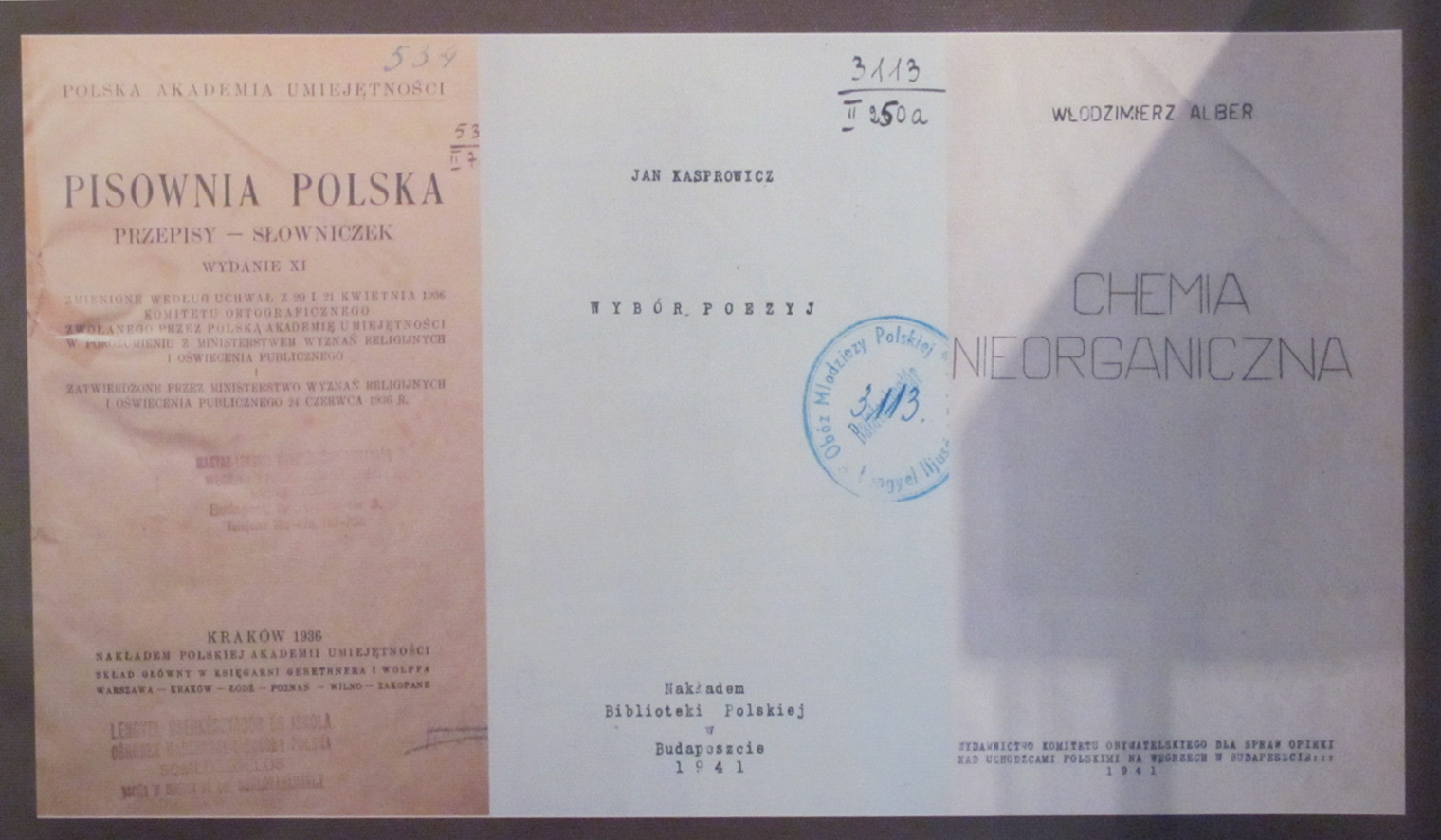
Polish schoolbooks from the Polish Gymnasium and Lyceum in Balatonboglár, a pre-war book from Poland, and two books printed in Budapest in 1941

Following the joint German-Soviet invasion of Poland, which started World War II in September 1939, over 100,000 military and civilians, including children, fled from Poland to Hungary.

The Hungarian authorities resisted German pressure to close the Polish Institute in Budapest, a Polish cultural institution established before the war. In order to do so, the Hungarians referred to the autonomy of the Royal Hungarian Pázmány Péter University, whose employee was the director of the Institute, Professor Zbigniew Załęski. The Institute was a place where Polish culture was freely and legally cultivated at a time when it was brutally suppressed in German- and Soviet-occupied Poland and Europe. The Institute also published Polish literature and press, and in addition to cultural activities, it helped Polish refugees and civilians in Hungary, and gave Hungarian language lessons to Poles so that they could study at Hungarian universities. It was closed only in 1944 due to the German occupation of Hungary, to be reopened after the war in 1951.

Dozens of Polish elementary schools were established in Hungary, 27 of which existed throughout the entire stay of Poles in Hungary, as well as high schools, including the significant Gymnasium and Lyceum in Balatonboglár, which functioned until the German invasion of Hungary in 1944.

In 1944, Hungarians gave shelter to Poles who escaped the Ukrainian-perpetrated massacres in German-occupied southeastern Poland to Hungary, and also facilitated further escapes.

== 1945 to present ==
Polish migration to Hungary after World War II primarily consisted of Poles whose partners were Hungarian.

The 2001 Census documented 5,144 Poles in Hungary, of whom 2,162 (42%) were foreign-born. According to the 2011 census, 7,001 Poles, including 2,303 (33%) foreign-born, and 1,744 Polish citizens resided in the country. The 2022 census recorded 7,398 Poles and 3,465 Polish citizens.

== Notable people ==
- Richeza of Poland (1013–1075), Queen consort of Hungary
- Fenenna of Kuyavia (c. 1276–1295), Queen consort of Hungary
- Bolesław of Toszek (c. 1276–1328), Archbishop of Esztergom
- Maria of Bytom (1295–1317), Queen consort of Hungary
- Mieszko of Bytom (c. 1305–1344), Bishop of Nyitra and Veszprém
- Nicholas Neszmélyi (d. 1360), Bishop of Pécs
- Elizabeth of Poland (1305–1380), Queen consort of Hungary, mother of Louis the Great
- Stibor of Stiboricz (c. 1348–1414), Lord of Beckov Castle, Voivode of Transylvania, close friend and advisor of King Sigismund of Hungary
- Gregory of Sanok (1403–1477), tutor of Hungarian kings Ladislaus III and Matthias Corvinus
- Marcin Bylica (1433–1493), court astrologer to King Matthias Corvinus
- Hedwig of Cieszyn (1469–1521), wife of Stephen Zápolya, mother of King of Hungary John Zápolya and Queen of Poland Barbara Zápolya
- Hieronymus Łaski (1496–1542), diplomat, Voivode of Transylvania
- Isabella Jagiellon (1519–1559), Queen consort of Hungary
- János Gonzeczky (1803–1849), military chaplain, martyr of Hungarian Revolution of 1848
- Zulawski family, family of Polish noble origin; Żuławski brothers arrived in Hungary during Hungarian Revolution of 1848 and participated in it
- Ernest Niżałowski (1915–2017), interpreter, leader of Polish Minority Self-Government's organization in Kőbánya
- Szilárd Zielinski (1860–1924), civil engineer, university professor, pioneer of reinforced concrete construction in Hungary
- Wanda Szyksznian (b. 1948), graphic and poster artist, university professor
- Halina Csúcs (b. 1948), special education teacher, public figure
- József Litwin (1953–2017), industrial artist
- Krzysztof Ducki (b. 1957), graphic artist
- Danuta Kozák (b.1987), sprint canoeist with Polish mother
- Willi Orbán (b. 1992), footballer with Polish grandfather
