= Demetrius of Sirmium =

Christian martyr (died 306) of Sirmium, today Serbia

Saint Demetrius of Sirmium
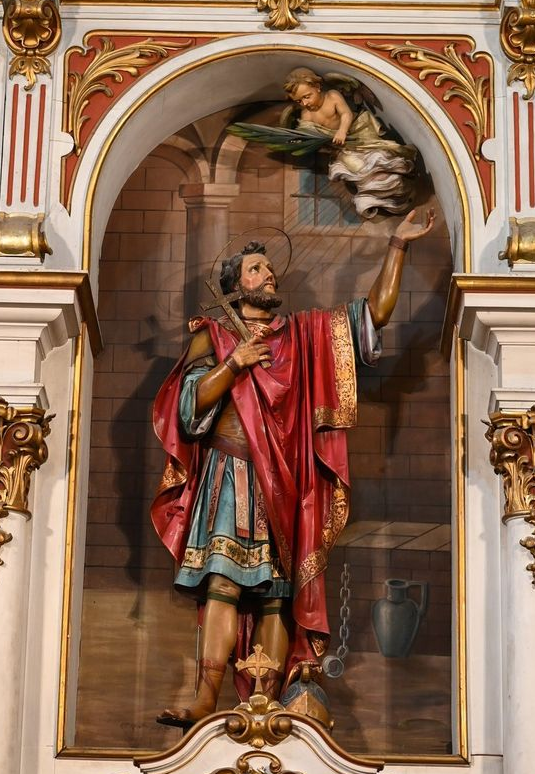
- Statue depicting Saint Demetrius from early 20th century, before revival of his cult as deacon
- Born: 270; Sirmium, Roman Empire (today Serbia)
- Died: 9 April 304; Sirmium, Roman Empire (today Serbia)
- Venerated in: Roman Catholicism
- Major shrine: Cathedral Basilica of St. Demetrius, Sremska Mitrovica, Serbia
- Feast: 9 April (martyrdom) & 26 October
- Attributes: depicted wearing the deacons dalmatic or Roman toga, usually carrying a palm branch or crucifix, sometimes portrayed with scorpion next to him
- Patronage: Sremska Mitrovica, Diocese of Syrmia, Serbia; Crusades; Deacons; Persecuted; Pannonia; University of Zadar;

Saint Demetrius of Sirmium (around 270, Sirmium, Roman Empire–9 April 304 Sirmium, Roman Empire) was a Roman deacon and martyr of the early 4th century.

He is often confused with the Greek saint Demetrius of Thessaloniki who lived in the same period.

== Life ==
He was born around 270 AD in Sirmium, present-day Sremska Mitrovica, as the son of a military officer. He served as a deacon to Bishop Irenaeus, who entrusted him with the safeguarding of sacred books. He was sentenced to death for preserving Christian texts and executed on April 9, 304, by order of Governor Probus. Although the exact manner of his martyrdom remains uncertain (whether by sword or spear), it is known that the execution took place one mile east of Sirmium's city walls, on the road to Bassianae. On the day of his martyrdom, seven consecrated virgins, as well as the deacons Donatus and Fortunatus, also met their deaths.

== Basilica ==
The Basilica of St. Demetrius was erected by the Roman prefect Leontius between 426 and 441 as a three-nave basilica of the Greek type at the site believed to be where Demetrius was martyred. It was destroyed during the Avar siege of the city of Sirmium in 505. St. Demetrius is also believed to have been a co-patron saint of the small Romanesque chapel near the entrance to the city's imperial palace.

== Iconography ==
Iconographically, St. Demetrius is depicted as a deacon or lector, vested in white toga with red deacons stole. According to later Thessalonikian tradition, he is wrongly portrayed as a young legionary, vested in Roman armour.
