= Đuro Gašparović =

Roman Catholic bishop from Serbia (born 1951)

- Diocesan Bishop Emeritus; Roman Catholic Diocese of Srijem
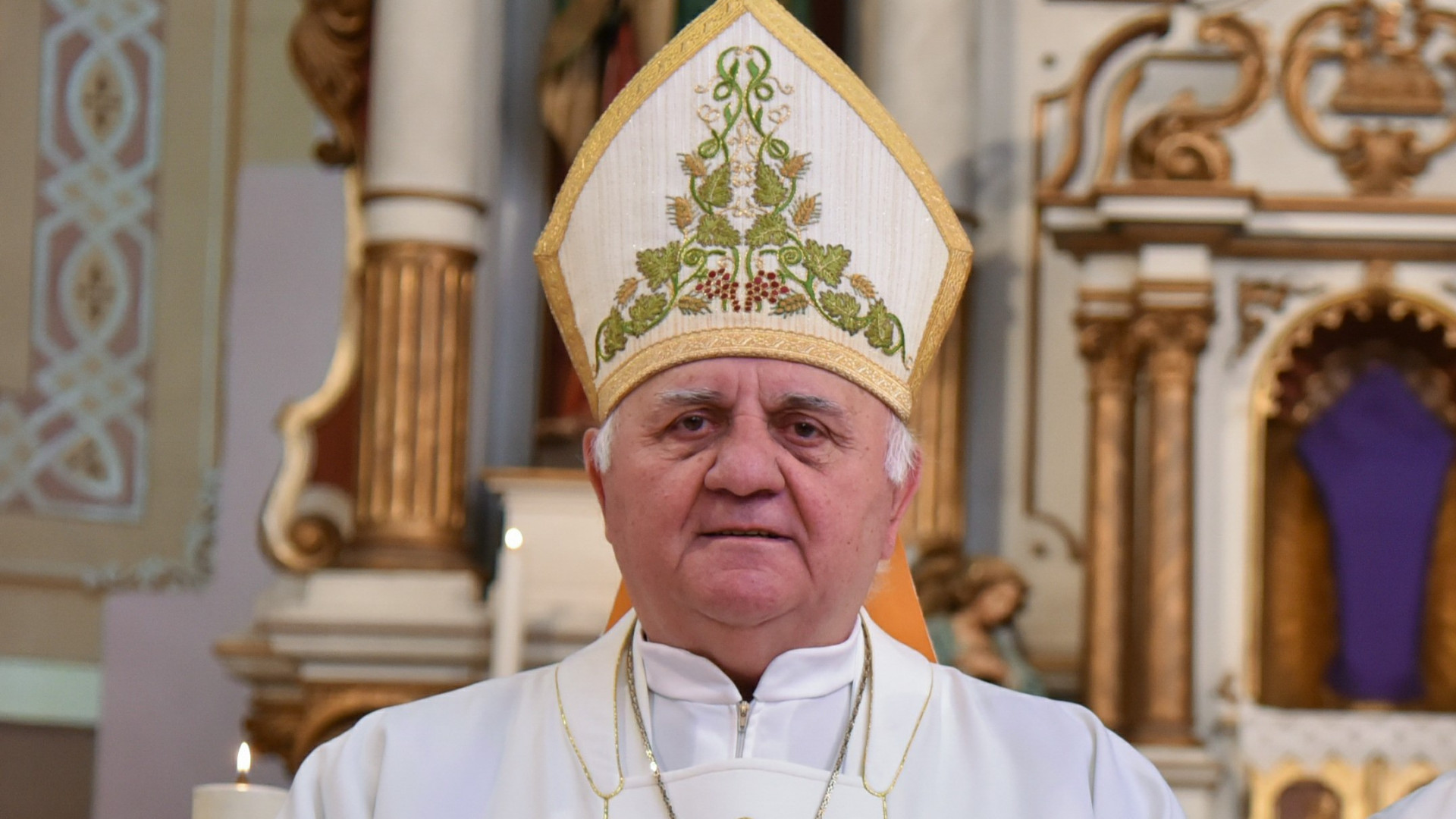
- Church: Roman Catholic Church
- Appointed: 18 June 2008
- Term ended: 14 February 2024
- Predecessor: Reestablished
- Successor: Fabijan Svalina
- Other posts: Titular Bishop of Mattiana, Auxiliary Bishop of Djakovo or Bosna and Srijem (1996–2008)

Orders
- Ordination: 29 June 1977 (Priest) by Ćiril Kos
- Consecration: 5 October 1996 (Bishop) by Cardinal Franjo Kuharić

Personal details
- Born: Đuro Gašparović; 20 June 1951 (age 75) Golubinci, FPR Yugoslavia (present day Serbia)
- Education: Pontifical Atheneum of St. Anselm, Pontifical Lateran University

Bishop Đuro Gašparović (Serbian Cyrillic: Ђуро Гашпаровић; born 20 June 1951) is a Roman Catholic prelate, Diocesan Bishop emeritus of the newly reestablished Diocese of Srijem in Serbia since 18 June 2008 until 14 February 2024. Previously he was a Titular Bishop of Mattiana and an Auxiliary Bishop of Djakovo or Bosna and Srijem in Croatia from 5 July 1996 until 18 June 2008.

== Education ==
Bishop Gašparović was born into a Vojvodina Croats Roman Catholic family of Antun and Ruža (née Bešker) near Stara Pazova.

After graduation from the school in his native town in 1966 and the classical gymnasium in the Minor Interdiocesan Seminary in Zagreb in 1968, he made the maturity exam at the Lyceum in Đakovo in 1970 and consequently joined the Major Theological Seminary in Đakovo, where he studied from 1972 until 1977, and was ordained as priest on 29 June 1977 for the Diocese of Đakovo or Bosnia and Syrmia by Bishop Ćiril Kos, after completed his philosophical and theological studies.

== Later career ==
After his ordination Fr. Gašparović a short time served as an assistant priest in Srijem (1977), a chaplain in Ruma (1977–1978) and parish priest in Irig (1978–1979). After that he transferred to Italy and while resided in the Pontifical Croatian College of St. Jerome in Rome, studied the Liturgics at the Pontifical Atheneum of St. Anselm (1979–1981) and the Canon Law, Civil Law and International Law at the Pontifical Lateran University (1979–1982). Also in the same time he served as the Vice-rector and Econom of the Pontifical Croatian College of St. Jerome (1980–1992) and an Official of the Congregation for the Evangelization of Peoples in Vatican (1992–1996).

== Prelate ==
On 5 July 1996, he was appointed by Pope John Paul II as an Auxiliary Bishop of Djakovo or Bosna and Srijem and Titular Bishop of Mattiana. On 5 October 1996, he was consecrated as bishop by Cardinal Franjo Kuharić and other prelates of the Roman Catholic Church in the Cathedral of St. Peter and St. Paul in Đakovo.

On 15 July 1999 the Holy See gave him a special authority to govern the Serbian part of the Diocese of Djakovo or Bosna and Srijem and on 1 October 1999 he was nomined as a Vicar General for Srijem with the residence in Petrovaradin. Nine years later, on 18 June 2008 he become the first Diocesan Bishop of the newly reestablished Diocese of Srijem and hence – a member of the International Bishops' Conference of Saints Cyril and Methodius.

Bishop Gašparović retired on 14 February 2024.

Coat of arms of Bishop Đuro Gašparović

Catholic Church titles
Preceded by Franz-Josef Hermann Bode	Titular Bishop of Mattiana; 1996–2008	Succeeded by Edmar Perón
Preceded by Reestablished	Diocesan Bishop of Srijem; 2008–2024	Succeeded by Fabijan Svalina
