= Fabijan Svalina =

Croatian-born Serbian priest

- Diocesan Bishop of Roman Catholic Diocese of Srijem
- Church: Roman Catholic Church
- Appointed: 14 February 2024
- Predecessor: Đuro Gašparović
- Successor: Incumbent
- Previous posts: Secretary of the Episcopal Ordinariate of Archdiocese of Đakovo-Osijek (2004–2010), Director of Croatian Caritas (2010–2021), Coadjutor Bishop of Srijem (2021–2024)

Orders
- Ordination: 29 June 1997 (Priest) by Marin Srakić
- Consecration: 21 November 2021 (Bishop) by Paul Richard Gallagher

Personal details
- Born: Fabijan Svalina; 7 November 1971 (age 54) Đakovo, SR Croatia, SFR Yugoslavia (modern Croatia)
- Education: University of Osijek

Bishop Fabijan Svalina (Serbian Cyrillic: Фабијан Свалина; born 7 November 1971) is a Roman Catholic prelate who is currently serving as a Diocesan Bishop of the Diocese of Srijem since 14 February 2024. Previously he served as a Coadjutor Bishop of the same Diocese since 7 October 2021 until 14 February 2024.

== Education ==
Bishop Svalina was born into a Roman Catholic family of Mirko and Lucija (née Poljičak) in Đakovo, but he grew up and finished his primary school education in neighbouring Satnica Đakovačka.

After graduation from the high school in his native town, he made the maturity exam and consequently joined the Major Theological Seminary in Đakovo and the Theological Faculty of the University of Osijek, where he graduated in 1997, and was ordained as priest on 29 June 1977 for the Roman Catholic Archdiocese of Đakovo-Osijek in the Cathedral basilica of St. Peter, after completed his philosophical and theological studies.

== Pastoral and administrative work ==
After his ordination Fr. Svalina a short time served as an assistant priest in the Exaltation of Holy Cross parish in Osijek-Retfala (1997–1998) and after was appointed as an educationist and prefect at the Interdiocesan Seminary in Šalata in Zagreb, where he served until 2004. From 2004 to 2010, he served in Đakovo as Secretary of the Episcopal Ordinariate, Chancellor of the Archdiocesan Ordinariate and Head of the Archdiocesan Press Office. He was a member of the Presbyteral council and a member of the Board of Advisors for several terms.

From 2010 he was an acting director, and from 2012 – a Director of the Croatian Caritas International, position, that he held until his election as bishop in 2021. In the same time, from 2010 until 2017 he served as Deputy Secretary General of the Episcopal Conference of Croatia, and from 2017 until 2021 was a director of the Croatian Catholic Network.

== Prelate ==
On 7 October 2021, he was appointed by Pope Francis as a Coadjutor Bishop of the Roman Catholic Diocese of Srijem in the neighbouring Serbia. On 21 November 2021, he was consecrated as bishop by Archbishop Paul Richard Gallagher and other prelates of the Roman Catholic Church in the athedral Basilica of St. Demetrius in Sremska Mitrovica and become a member of the International Bishops' Conference of Saints Cyril and Methodius.

On 14 February 2024 he succeeded as the Diocesan bishop, after the resignation of his predecessor.

Catholic Church titles
Preceded by –	Coadjutor Bishop of Srijem; 2020–2024	Succeeded by –
Preceded by Đuro Gašparović	Diocesan Bishop of Srijem; 2024–	Incumbent
