= Siemowit of Bytom =

Siemowit
- Duke of Bytom, Gliwice
- Born: 1292
- Died: aft. 1 July 1342
- Noble family: Silesian Piasts
- Father: Casimir of Bytom
- Mother: Helena (of Galicia?)

Siemowit of Bytom (Polish: Siemowit bytomski; (1292 – aft. 1 July 1342), was a Duke of Bytom during 1312–1316 and Duke of Gliwice from 1340 until his death.

He was the third son of Duke Casimir of Bytom by his wife Helena.

It's unknown why after his death in 1312, his father left Siemowit the most extensive part of his Duchy, Bytom (already since 1311, he was made the formal co-ruler). Despite Siemowit's role that was not too important, he established contacts with the court of Władysław I the Elbow-high in the Wawel Castle. Siemowit could maintain his rule over Bytom for only four years, until 1316, when, in unknown circumstances, his older brother Władysław assumed the government of the Duchy. The next information about Siemowit is found on 19 February 1327, when, together with his brothers Władysław and George, he paid homage to the Bohemian King John of Luxembourg in Opawa. This event demonstrated that, whatever the reasons why Siemowit lost his sovereignty over Bytom in 1316, at the end of the 1320s there is a full reconciliation between the brothers. Siemowit was then mentioned again around 1340 in a document of the Bishop of Wrocław, Przecław z Pogorzeli, where he is named Duke of Gliwice. This is the last notice about Siemowit as a living person. He died between 1342 and 1355, probably closer to 1342. He died unmarried and childless, and it is unknown where he was buried.

After his death, the city of Gliwice returned to the Duchy of Bytom.

Regnal titles
Preceded by Casimir	Duke of Bytom; 1312–1316	Succeeded by Władysław and George
