= Pouka =

Hungarian prelate

- Bishop of Syrmia
- Installed: 1277
- Term ended: 1293
- Predecessor: John
- Successor: Nicholas

Personal details
- Died: 1293/99
- Denomination: Catholic

Pouka (Hungarian: Póka; died between 1293 and 1299) was a Hungarian prelate in the 13th century, who served as Bishop of Syrmia from around 1277 until 1293.

== Career ==
Pouka (or Pobka) was referred to as Provost of Kő, the primary cathedral chapter of the Diocese of Syrmia (Hungarian: Szerém, Serbian: Srem) in 1265. He was elected as Bishop of Syrmia sometime after 1269. In this capacity, he participated in the national diet of prelates, barons and noblemen in May 1277, when the young monarch Ladislaus IV of Hungary was declared to be of age. Before that, Ladislaus held a meeting with several prelates, including Pouka, according to his royal charter issued in 1289. Pouka also attended that assembly at Tétény in 1279, where the barons and prelates prescribed that the Cumans should leave their tents and live "in houses attached to the ground". Thereafter, he was also present at the synod in Buda on 14 September 1279, convened by papal legate Philip, Bishop of Fermo.

Pouka served as vice-chancellor in the court of Queen Dowager Elizabeth the Cuman in 1282. Pouka was considered a supporter of Andrew III of Hungary. He was last mentioned as bishop in July 1293. He was succeeded by Nicholas, who first appeared in this capacity six years later, in July 1299.

== Sources ==
- Ternovácz, Bálint (2011). "A szerémi püspökök életrajza, valamint a kői, illetve a szenternyei székeskáptalan archontológiája a 14. század közepéig [The Biography of the Bishops of Szerém, and the Archontology of the Chapters of Kő and Szenternye until the Mid-14th Century]". Magyar Egyháztörténeti Vázlatok (in Hungarian). 23 (1–2): 33–47. ISSN 0865-5227.
- Zsoldos, Attila (2011). Magyarország világi archontológiája, 1000–1301 [Secular Archontology of Hungary, 1000–1301] (in Hungarian). História, MTA Történettudományi Intézete. ISBN 978-963-9627-38-3.

Catholic Church titles
Preceded by John	Bishop of Syrmia; 1277–1293	Succeeded by Nicholas
