= Oliver (bishop of Syrmia) =

Hungarian prelate

- Bishop of Syrmia
- Installed: 1250
- Term ended: 1262
- Predecessor: Innocent (?)
- Successor: John

Personal details
- Died: after December 1262
- Denomination: Catholic

Oliver (Hungarian: Olivér; died after December 1262) was a Hungarian prelate in the 13th century, who served as Bishop of Syrmia from 1250 to 1262. He resigned due to poor health and joined the Franciscans.

== Career ==
Oliver first appeared as Bishop of Syrmia (Hungarian: Szerém, Serbian: Srem) in a contemporary document on 6 November 1250, when donated the village of Dras (Drasch) to Lawrence Becsegergely, the provost of Szenternye (present-day a borough of Sremska Mitrovica, Serbia). Oliver's name was involved in the list of barons and prelates in the royal charter of Béla IV of Hungary, issued on 28 June 1254.

Oliver intended to resign from his position and join the Franciscan Order due to his poor health and "severe fatigue of his body" in 1262. As a result, he sent his two clergymen, treasurer Thomas and canon Peter to the Roman Curia to ask for his acquittal from Pope Urban IV. In response, the pope wrote a letter to Oliver's metropolitan, Archbishop Smaragd of Kalocsa in December 1262, and ordered him to investigate the circumstances and if he sees fit, accept the resignation of Oliver, absolve him from the obligation to govern the diocese and allow him to join the Franciscan monks. The cathedral chapter of Syrmia already elected John as his successor in December 1262. Oliver retired and became a Franciscan friar. His place and date of death are unknown.

== Sources ==
- Ternovácz, Bálint (2011). "A szerémi püspökök életrajza, valamint a kői, illetve a szenternyei székeskáptalan archontológiája a 14. század közepéig [The Biography of the Bishops of Szerém, and the Archontology of the Chapters of Kő and Szenternye until the Mid-14th Century]". Magyar Egyháztörténeti Vázlatok (in Hungarian). 23 (1–2): 33–47. ISSN 0865-5227.
- Udvardy, József (1991). A kalocsai érsekek életrajza (1000–1526) [Biographies of Archbishops of Kalocsa, 1000–1526] (in Hungarian). Görres Gesellschaft.
- Zsoldos, Attila (2011). Magyarország világi archontológiája, 1000–1301 [Secular Archontology of Hungary, 1000–1301] (in Hungarian). História, MTA Történettudományi Intézete. ISBN 978-963-9627-38-3.

Catholic Church titles
Preceded by Innocent (?)	Bishop of Syrmia; 1250–1262	Succeeded by John
