= Innocent (bishop of Syrmia) =

Hungarian prelate

- Bishop of Syrmia
- Installed: 1232 (or before)
- Term ended: 1233/50
- Predecessor: first known
- Successor: Oliver (?)

Personal details
- Denomination: Catholic

Innocent (Hungarian: Ince) was a Hungarian prelate in the 13th century, who served as the first known Bishop of Syrmia from 1232 to 1233.

== Career ==
The Diocese of Syrmia (Hungarian: Szerém, Serbian: Srem) was established as a suffragan bishopric of the Archdiocese of Kalocsa in 1229. As Innocent appeared as bishop for the first and last time in 1232, it is possible he was actually the first head of the newly established diocese. His name as a witness was preserved in a charter issued by papal legate Giacomo di Pecorari, who transcribed that diploma of Robert, Archbishop of Esztergom, in which he put the Kingdom of Hungary under an interdict. Croatian historian Emerik Gašić claimed Innocent functioned as bishop throughout from 1231 to 1233, but there is no source for that. Innocent issued his charter on 27 November 1233, this is the last mention of him.

== Sources ==
- Ternovácz, Bálint (2011). "A szerémi püspökök életrajza, valamint a kői, illetve a szenternyei székeskáptalan archontológiája a 14. század közepéig [The Biography of the Bishops of Szerém, and the Archontology of the Chapters of Kő and Szenternye until the Mid-14th Century]". Magyar Egyháztörténeti Vázlatok (in Hungarian). 23 (1–2): 33–47. ISSN 0865-5227.
- Zsoldos, Attila (2011). Magyarország világi archontológiája, 1000–1301 [Secular Archontology of Hungary, 1000–1301] (in Hungarian). História, MTA Történettudományi Intézete. ISBN 978-963-9627-38-3.

Catholic Church titles
Preceded by first known	Bishop of Syrmia; 1232–1233	Succeeded by Oliver (?)
