= John (bishop of Syrmia) =

Hungarian prelate

- Bishop of Syrmia
- Installed: 1262
- Term ended: 1269
- Predecessor: Oliver
- Successor: Pouka

Personal details
- Died: 1269/77
- Denomination: Catholic

John (Hungarian: János; died between 1269 and 1277) was a Hungarian prelate in the 13th century, who served as Bishop of Syrmia from 1262 to 1269, at least.

== Career ==
John was Provost of Arad from an unknown date until 1262. He was already styled as Provost of Arad and Bishop-elect of Syrmia on 5 December 1262 (Hungarian: Szerém, Serbian: Srem), when Duke Stephen took an oath at Poroszló and confirmed his reconciliation with his father, King Béla IV of Hungary after their brief civil war in accordance with the Peace of Pressburg, which was concluded in the autumn of 1262 with the mediation of archbishops Philip Türje of Esztergom and Smaragd of Kalocsa, in addition to the attendance of Philip, Bishop of Vác, Benedict, Provost of Szeben and John, Provost of Arad.

Despite John's title of bishop-elect in the aforementioned document, Pope Urban IV still entitled his predecessor, Oliver in his letter dated 13 December 1262. According to its narration, Oliver petitioned to the Roman Curia for his acquittal from the dignity due to his poor health. Consequently, John was elected bishop prior to the pope would have allowed Oliver to resign from his position. It is possible that, Oliver had died by that time, when Pope Urban sent his letter to his superior, Smaragd of Kalocsa, or John already acted as gubernator of the diocese, substituting Oliver, who suffered from a serious illness, and Duke Stephen's oath of letter anticipated John's title and dignity. Beside that document, John only appears as Bishop of Syrmia in a royal charter issued by Béla IV in 1269. He was succeeded by Pouka, who was first mentioned in this capacity in 1277.

== Sources ==
- Kovács, István (2018). "Az aradi káptalan elöljárói: a prépostok (1135–1526) [Provosts of the Medieval Episcopal See of Arad (1135–1526)]". In Czeferner, Dóra; Böhm, Gábor; Fedeles, Tamás (eds.). Mesterek és Tanítványok 2. Tanulmányok a bölcsészet- és társadalomtudományok területéről (in Hungarian). University of Pécs. pp. 147–163. ISBN 978-963-429-223-4.
- Ternovácz, Bálint (2011). "A szerémi püspökök életrajza, valamint a kői, illetve a szenternyei székeskáptalan archontológiája a 14. század közepéig [The Biography of the Bishops of Szerém, and the Archontology of the Chapters of Kő and Szenternye until the Mid-14th Century]". Magyar Egyháztörténeti Vázlatok (in Hungarian). 23 (1–2): 33–47. ISSN 0865-5227.
- Zsoldos, Attila (2011). Magyarország világi archontológiája, 1000–1301 [Secular Archontology of Hungary, 1000–1301] (in Hungarian). História, MTA Történettudományi Intézete. ISBN 978-963-9627-38-3.

Catholic Church titles
Preceded by Albert (?)	Provost of Arad ?–1262	Succeeded by Benedict
Preceded by Oliver	Bishop of Syrmia; 1262–1269	Succeeded by Pouka
