= Vincent (archbishop of Kalocsa) =

Hungarian prelate

- Archbishop of Kalocsa
- Installed: 1306
- Term ended: 1311
- Predecessor: Stephen
- Successor: Demetrius Vicsadoli (elected)
- Other posts: Bishop of Syrmia; Chancellor

Personal details
- Died: May/September 1311
- Denomination: Roman Catholic

Vincent (Hungarian: Vince; died between May and September 1311) was a Hungarian prelate at the turn of the 13th and 14th centuries, who served as Bishop of Syrmia till 1306, then Archbishop of Kalocsa from 1306 until his death. He supported the claim of Charles I of Hungary in his struggle for the Hungarian throne.

== Early career ==
Vincent was a relative of the powerful lord Ugrin Csák, who ruled the northern part of Syrmia (Hungarian: Szerém, Serbian: Srem) as a provincial lord, and was considered one of the most ardent partisans of Charles during the war of succession in the first decade of the 14th century. As a result some historians proposed, Vincent was also a member of the Újlak branch of the gens (clan) Csák and referred to him as "Vincent Csák", but whether he was related to Ugrin Csák from the maternal or paternal side is unknown. His name does not appear on the family tree of the Csáks, compiled by historian Pál Engel.

Vincent started his ecclesiastical career as guardian (custos) at the collegiate chapter of Székesfehérvár, according to historian György Pray. Sometime after 1300, he was elected as Bishop of Syrmia. After the extinction of the Árpád dynasty, Ugrin Csák governed the province independently of the royal power. His protege, Charles of Anjou withdrew to his domain after the coronation of his rival Wenceslaus, consequently Vincent was one of his local partisans, becoming a member of Charles' retinue.

== Archbishop of Kalocsa ==
Following almost two years after his predecessor, Stephen's death, Vincent was transferred to the Archdiocese of Kalocsa by Pope Clement V on 8 July 1306. After his appointment, Vincent sent Nicholas, archdeacon of Bács (present-day Bač, Serbia) to the Roman Curia to deliver his archiepiscopal pallium. Pope Clement instructed Vincent's successor, Ladislaus, Bishop of Syrmia to investigate the regularity of his election. After a positive feedback, the pope handed over the symbolic cloak to Archdeacon Nicholas at Poitiers on 31 July 1307. In his letter, the pope mentioned that Charles II of Naples (Charles of Hungary's grandfather) interceded for the archbishop to receive the pallium. Historian Vilmos Fraknói expressed that "there can be no question that the promotion of this prelate [Vincent] should be traced back to the influence of Anjous". Vincent was a strong pillar of Charles's early reign, who successfully overcame his opponents by turn of 1307 and 1308. He was first styled as chancellor for the monarch on 10 October 1307. It is plausible that he was the first person, who held that office in the emerging royal court of Charles. Vincent paid his servitium commune to the Roman Curia in three installments in 1309, 1310 and 1311 (altogether 780 golden florins), which provoked the displeasure of the pope. He was unable to pay the full amount until the end of his bishopric (there was a shortfall of 1,000 golden florins according to a 1313 papal instruction).

Around August or September 1306, Pope Clement V ordered Archbishop Vincent to excommunicate the notorious Transylvanian voivode, Ladislaus Kán and to place his territory under ecclesiastic interdict, because the oligarch was reluctant to recognize the legitimacy of Charles I and nominally supported the other pretender, Otto of Bavaria. Vincent fulfilled the order in December. Peter Monoszló, the Bishop of Transylvania, who maintained a distant but peaceful relationship with the voivode, disagreed with that step and expressed his displeasure, leaving the local clergymen and monks to ignore the punishment. As a result, Vincent held out the prospect of the same ecclesiastic disciplinary actions against his nominal suffragan, Peter in case he would not excommunicate Ladislaus Kán who had previously also seized the properties of the Archdiocese of Kalocsa. Some weeks later, on 20 January, Vincent withdrew the punishment on Peter Monoszló at the request of Charles and Ugrin Csák.

Vincent was present at the Diet of Rákos on 10 October 1307, which confirmed Charles' claim to the Hungarian throne. The attending barons and prelates also swore loyalty to the monarch. In addition, the diet authorized the two archbishops of the realm, Thomas of Esztergom and Vincent of Kalocsa to excommunicate the "oath-breakers" and those who raise objections to the decision. Meanwhile, Pope Clement also ordered the two archbishops to summon Anthony, Bishop of Csanád before the papal curia, because of his involvement in the coronation of Otto, and to proclaim the papal judgment that Charles is the rightful Hungarian king. Vincent supported the activity of papal legate Gentile Portino da Montefiore, who was sent to Hungary in 1308 with the primary task of assuring the Angevins the Hungarian throne. When the legate arrived to Split (Spalato) at the end of May, he sent a letter to Vincent, in which he stated that he reserves the right to bestow all church benefice above worth 10 marks exclusively to himself. Gentile arrived to Zagreb in early September, where Charles I greeted him. Vincent was among the dignitaries. Vincent attended that general diet, summoned by Gentile in the Dominican monastery of Pest on 27 November 1308, which elected Charles king. He also attended the subsequent synod, convoked by Gentile and Archbishop Thomas, where the prelates declared the monarch inviolable in December 1308. The papal legate also entrusted the two archbishops, Thomas and Vincent to convoke another synod in May 1309. In preparation for Charles' second coronation, the oligarch Henry Kőszegi met papal legate Gentile, archbishops Thomas and Vincent, and other bishops and nobles in his manor at Tétény (present-day part of Budapest) on 4 June 1309, where he confirmed his oath of allegiance to Charles on behalf of himself and his family. Vincent was also present and contributed in the second coronation of Charles I on 15 June 1309.

Returning to his archdiocese, Vincent convoked a provincial synod in late August 1309, whose decisions are unknown. Along with Lawrence, the provost of Bács, Vincent petitioned to the royal court in favor of the serfs of the chapter of Bács, whose privileges were threatened by the surrounding nobles during Charles' war against the oligarchs. Previously they were exempted from compulsory delivery of foodstuff, but unnamed nobles were not inclined to acknowledge this and demanded food for their armies. In response to Vincent's complaint, Charles I restored and confirmed the privileges of the serfs of Bács on 3 February 1311. Upon the order of the pope, Vincent actively participated in the suppression of the order of the Knights Templar in Hungary, seizing all their property in the territory of his archdiocese and suffragan bishoprics. Vincent was invited to the Council of Vienne in January 1310, but opening of the council delayed and took place only after the death of Vincent. Nevertheless, after the invitation, he invited Augustin Kažotić, the Bishop of Zagreb to a meeting to discuss in advance the topics that would arise at the council. Vincent was last mentioned as a living person on 29 May 1311. He died in that year, as his successor Demetrius Vicsadoli was elected as archbishop already around early September.

== Sources ==
- Engel, Pál (1996). Magyarország világi archontológiája, 1301–1457, I. [Secular Archontology of Hungary, 1301–1457, Volume I] (in Hungarian). História, MTA Történettudományi Intézete. ISBN 963-8312-44-0.
- Kádár, Tamás (2017). "Harcban a koronáért. (II.) I. Károly (Róbert) király uralkodásának 1306–1310 közötti szakasza [Fight for the Crown. The Reign of Charles I (Robert) from 1306 to 1310]". Történeti Tanulmányok. Acta Universitatis Debreceniensis (in Hungarian). 25: 126–192. ISSN 1217-4602.
- Maléth, Ágnes (2020). A Magyar Királyság és a Szentszék kapcsolata I. Károly korában (1301–1342) [The Relationship of the Hungarian Kingdom and the Holy See in the time of Charles I (1301–1342)] (in Hungarian). Pécsi Tudományegyetem BTK TTI Középkori és Koraújkori Történeti Tanszék. ISBN 978-963-429-500-6.
- Markó, László (2006). A magyar állam főméltóságai Szent Istvántól napjainkig: Életrajzi Lexikon [Great Officers of State in Hungary from King Saint Stephen to Our Days: A Biographical Encyclopedia] (in Hungarian). Helikon Kiadó. ISBN 963-208-970-7.
- Ternovácz, Bálint (2011). "A szerémi püspökök életrajza, valamint a kői, illetve a szenternyei székeskáptalan archontológiája a 14. század közepéig [The Biography of the Bishops of Szerém, and the Archontology of the Chapters of Kő and Szenternye until the Mid-14th Century]". Magyar Egyháztörténeti Vázlatok (in Hungarian). 23 (1–2): 33–47. ISSN 0865-5227.
- Udvardy, József (1991). A kalocsai érsekek életrajza (1000–1526) [Biographies of Archbishops of Kalocsa, 1000–1526] (in Hungarian). Görres Gesellschaft.

Catholic Church titles
Preceded by Nicholas	Bishop of Syrmia ?–1306	Succeeded by Ladislaus
Preceded by Stephen	Archbishop of Kalocsa; 1306–1311	Succeeded by Demetrius Vicsadoli elected
Political offices
Preceded by Anthony	Chancellor; 1307–1311	Succeeded by Ladislaus Jánki
