= Casimir of Bytom =

Duke of Opole and Bytom

Casimir
- Duke of Opole, Bytom
- Born: 1253/57
- Died: 10 March 1312
- Noble family: Silesian Piasts of Opole
- Spouse: Helena (of Galicia?)
- Issue: Bolesław of Toszek; Władysław of Bytom; Siemowit of Bytom; Maria; George; Mieszko of Bytom
- Father: Władysław Opolski
- Mother: Euphemia of Greater Poland

Casimir of Bytom (Polish: Kazimierz; 1253/57 – 10 March 1312) was a Duke of Opole during 1282–1284 (with his brother as co-ruler) and Duke of Bytom from 1284 until his death.

He was the second son of Władysław, Duke of Opole–Racibórz, by his wife Euphemia, daughter of Władysław Odonic, Duke of Greater Poland.

== Life ==
Little is known about the first years of Casimir's life. By 1264, he was knighted by King Ottokar II of Bohemia and with this began his politic activities with his father.

After the death of his father in 1282, Casimir inherited the Duchy of Opole with his brother Bolko I as co-rulers. The common rule between them lasted until 1284, when they decided to make a formal division of their domains: Casimir took the towns of Bytom (the main city and now capital of his Duchy), Koźle, Toszek, Gliwice and Siewierz.

There are few reports of Casimir's independent rule. Certainly at the end of the 1280s he and his brothers Mieszko I and Przemysław supported the Bishop of Wrocław, Thomas II Zaremba in his conflict with Henry IV Probus, the powerful Duke of Wrocław -their other brother Bolko I unexpectedly supported Henry IV. The cause of the bad relations between Władysław Opolski's sons and the Duke of Wrocław possibly started when Henry IV repudiated his wife Constance (sister of the Opole-Racibórz brothers) and sent her back home. The reasons for this repudiation are disputed among historians, but it probably was because of the Constance's suspected infertility.

The difficult relations with Henry IV Probus brought a much greater enemy into the Silesian affairs. On 10 January 1289 Casimir was the first Silesian Duke to pay homage to the Bohemian King Wenceslaus II in Prague. The direct arguments which caused Casimir to make this radical step are unclear. In any event, the Dukes of Cieszyn and Racibórz soon followed the example of Casimir and also paid homage to the Kingdom of Bohemia (some historians believed that this could be the cause of the bloody Battle of Siewierz on 26 February of that year).

In subsequent years, Casimir remained a faithful ally of King Wenceslaus II in his Polish politics, although the close cooperation with the Bohemian Kingdom didn't directly benefit him (except for his presence during the King's trips to Sieradz in 1292 or at the coronation of Wenceslaus II in Prague in 1297).

In 1303, Casimir decided to give his sons separate districts, which further helped to reduce the already small Duchy of Bytom: Bolesław received Toszek and Władysław obtained Koźle.

The extinction of the Přemyslid dynasty after the death of King Wenceslaus III in 1306 caused the Duke of Bytom to stop his homage to the Bohemian crown. From that moment, Casimir had a significant change in his foreign politics, became more closely associated with the new Duke of Kraków, Władysław I the Elbow-high. The marriage of Casimir's daughter Maria to the Hungarian King Charles Robert in 1306 surely increased the prestige of both Casimir and his Duchy.

In internal politics, Casimir was a strong guardian of the Catholic Church, especially the Church of the Holy Sepulchre, Miechów of the Canons of the Holy Sepulchre, which received many privileges from him. He also gave the order to build castles of considerable size in Bytom and surrounding towns, thanks to the revenues obtained from the silver mines in Bytom.

Casimir died on 10 March 1312. It's unknown where he was buried but it is possible that the burial could have occurred in the monastery of Czarnowąsy in Opole, which was generously supported by the Duke.

== Marriage and issue ==
Between 1275–1278, Casimir married Helena (d. by 1323), whose origins are unknown. Given by her name and the choice of her children's names, historians believed that she had a Russian or Lithuanian origin; according to genealogist Kazimierz Jasiński, she may have been a daughter of Lev I of Galicia by his wife Constance, daughter of King Béla IV of Hungary, although other theories placed her as daughter of Lev I's brother Shvarn, Grand Duke of Lithuania. If Helena was indeed Lev I's daughter, she was probably named after Constance's sister Blessed Jolenta Helena of Poland, wife of Bolesław the Pious, one of the Greater Poland Dukes. They had six children:

1. Bolesław (b. 1276/78 – d. 17 January 1329).
2. Władysław (b. 1277/83 – d. by 8 September 1352).
3. Siemowit (b. 1292 – d. aft. 1 July 1342).
4. Maria (b. ca. 1295 – d. Temesvár, 15 December 1317), married in 1306 to King Charles I Robert of Hungary.
5. George (b. 1300 – d. by 1327).
6. Mieszko (b. ca. 1305 – d. bef. 9 August 1344).

The considerable age difference between Casimir's three older and three younger children created the theory that he maybe had more than one wife. However, there is no evidence that supports this and the majority of historians accept that Helena was his only wife and mother of all his known children.

== Notes ==
Casimir of Bytom House of Piast Born: between 1253 and 1257 Died: 1312
Regnal titles
Preceded by Władysław	Duke of Opole with Bolko I 1282–1284	Succeeded by Bolko I
New creation	Duke of Bytom; 1284–1312	Succeeded by Siemowit
