= Demetrius Vicsadoli =

Hungarian clergyman

- Archbishop-elect of Kalocsa
- Installed: 1311
- Term ended: 1317
- Predecessor: Vincent
- Successor: Ladislaus Jánki
- Other post: Provost of Kalocsa

Personal details
- Died: 1351
- Denomination: Roman Catholic

Demetrius Vicsadoli (Hungarian: Vicsadoli Demeter; died 1351) was a Hungarian clergyman in the first half of the 14th century, who was elected Archbishop of Kalocsa by the cathedral chapter in 1311, but Pope John XXII decreed that the election would be annulled and appointed Ladislaus Jánki instead.

== Background ==
His origin is uncertain. He owned a portion of land along the fort of Vicsadol in Valkó County, near present-day Vučedol ("Wolf's Valley"), located six kilometers downstream from the town of Vukovar, Croatia. Vicsadoli served as provost of the cathedral chapter of Kalocsa from 1309 to 1351. He was a well-educated cleric, skilled in canon law. He was succeeded by John de Surdis as provost.

== Archbishop-elect ==
After the death of Vincent in the summer of 1311, Vicsadoli was elected as his successor by the joint session of the cathedral chapter of Kalocsa and the collegiate chapter of Bács (today Bač, Serbia). He requested papal legate, Gentile Portino da Montefiore to confirm his election and even paid a procuratio of 18 marks to the papal legate. However, Gentile was recalled to the Roman Curia by Pope Clement V in order to participate in the Council of Vienne. Gentile left Hungary on 10 September 1311. Previously, the papal legate postponed the approval of the election for some reason. Pope Clement required a personal appearance of Vicsadoli before the Holy See, but the archbishop-elect was unable to travel to Avignon, because the lands of his archdiocese was threatened and seized by the troops of Syrmian ruler Stefan Dragutin. Vicsadoli sent his envoys to the Council of Vienne, but the pope refused to meet the delegation, which then continued to travel to Malause in the Diocese of Vaison, but the audience did not happen here either. There, Pope Clement commissioned cardinal Pietro Colonna studying the case. The pope called on the archbishop-elect to visit the court personally on 29 December 1312. It is not known whether the trip has been occurred or not. Despite the lack of confirmation of his election, Vicsadoli functioned as apostolic administrator of the archdiocese.

Pope Clement V died in April 1314, and his successor, Pope John XXII was elected only after a two-year period of election procedure and took office in August 1316. The new pope established a three-member committee of cardinals – consisted of Raymond de Saint-Sever of Santa Pudenziana, Napoleone Orsini Frangipani of Sant'Adriano al Foro and Jacopo Colonna – in order to fill the position of Archbishop of Kalocsa. After hearing its report, Pope John decreed that the election of Vicsadoli would be annulled for "some reason", as his charter indicated. Historian Menyhért Érdújhelyi considered Vicsadoli was a domestic opponent to the ruling Capetian House of Anjou or he was not a favored subject in the royal court. Charles I of Hungary proposed his protege and personal confessor Ladislaus Jánki to become the new archbishop. Pope John appointed Jánki as Archbishop of Kalocsa on 3 July 1317.

== Sources ==
- Engel, Pál (1996). Magyarország világi archontológiája, 1301–1457, I. [Secular Archontology of Hungary, 1301–1457, Volume I] (in Hungarian). História, MTA Történettudományi Intézete. ISBN 963-8312-44-0.
- Maléth, Ágnes (2020). A Magyar Királyság és a Szentszék kapcsolata I. Károly korában (1301–1342) [The Relationship of the Hungarian Kingdom and the Holy See in the time of Charles I (1301–1342)] (in Hungarian). Pécsi Tudományegyetem BTK TTI Középkori és Koraújkori Történeti Tanszék. ISBN 978-963-429-500-6.
- Udvardy, József (1991). A kalocsai érsekek életrajza (1000–1526) [Biographies of Archbishops of Kalocsa, 1000–1526] (in Hungarian). Görres Gesellschaft.

Catholic Church titles
Preceded by Vincent	Archbishop of Kalocsa elected 1311–1317	Succeeded by Ladislaus Jánki
