= Nicholas (bishop of Syrmia) =

Hungarian prelate

- Bishop of Syrmia
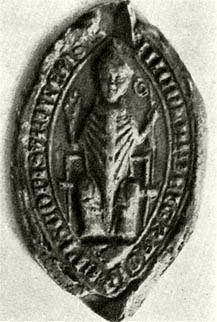
- Seal of Nicholas (1299)
- Installed: 1299
- Term ended: 1300
- Predecessor: Pouka
- Successor: Vincent

Personal details
- Died: after 1300
- Denomination: Catholic

Nicholas (Hungarian: Miklós; died after 1300) was a Hungarian prelate in the 13th century, who served as Bishop of Syrmia from around 1299 to 1300.

== Career ==
Nicholas first appeared as Bishop of Syrmia (Hungarian: Szerém, Serbian: Srem) in July 1299. Upon the request of the Cistercian monks of Bélakút Abbey (near present-day Petrovaradin, Serbia), Nicholas transcribed and confirmed their privileges on 31 January 1300, formerly granted by Archbishop Lodomer in 1286. He was last mentioned as bishop by a charter of Michael Bő, Bishop of Zagreb on 6 March 1300. His seal was preserved by the aforementioned document, issued in July 1299.

== Sources ==
- Ternovácz, Bálint (2011). "A szerémi püspökök életrajza, valamint a kői, illetve a szenternyei székeskáptalan archontológiája a 14. század közepéig [The Biography of the Bishops of Szerém, and the Archontology of the Chapters of Kő and Szenternye until the Mid-14th Century]". Magyar Egyháztörténeti Vázlatok (in Hungarian). 23 (1–2): 33–47. ISSN 0865-5227.
- Zsoldos, Attila (2011). Magyarország világi archontológiája, 1000–1301 [Secular Archontology of Hungary, 1000–1301] (in Hungarian). História, MTA Történettudományi Intézete. ISBN 978-963-9627-38-3.

Catholic Church titles
Preceded by Pouka	Bishop of Syrmia; 1299–1300	Succeeded by Vincent
