= Ladislaus Jánki =

Hungarian Franciscan friar

- Archbishop of Kalocsa
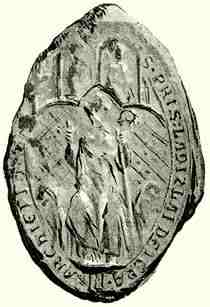
- Seal of Ladislaus Jánki
- Installed: 1317
- Term ended: 1336 or 1337
- Predecessor: Demetrius Vicsadoli (elected)
- Successor: Ladislaus Kaboli
- Other post: Chancellor

Orders
- Consecration: 15 August 1317 by Nicolò Albertini

Personal details
- Died: October 1336/March 1337
- Denomination: Roman Catholic
- Parents: Nicholas Jánki

Ladislaus Jánki (Hungarian: Jánki László; died between October 1336 and March 1337) was a Hungarian Franciscan friar and prelate in the first half of the 14th century, who served as Archbishop of Kalocsa and chancellor of the royal court from 1317 until his death. He was considered a faithful partisan of Charles I of Hungary.

== Ancestry and early life ==
He was born into a family of presumed Italian origin, which possessed lands and villages in the Banate of Severin, the southeastern part of the Kingdom of Hungary. Their eponymous estate, the village of Jánk laid along the river Karas in Krassó County. According to historian Mihály Horváth, he was a relative of King Charles I, but there is no record of it. His father was Nicholas, from whom he inherited the village of Pacsinta (present-day Pačetin in Croatia). He had a brother, royal courtier Gregory, who also owned a portion of the settlement and presumably died in 1308. He also had a sister, Margaret, the spouse of Michael Szentmihályi from the gens Dorozsma. Ladislaus donated his portion in Pacsinta to his sister in 1330. The Jánki family belonged to the partisans of Charles I in his efforts to acquire the Hungarian throne. Ladislaus' cousins, Thomas, Paul and Nicholas played an active role in restoring and strengthening royal power against the oligarchs along the southern border of the kingdom.

Jánki entered the Franciscans. He was a well-educated cleric skilled in theology and canon law. It is plausible that he is identical with that Minorite friar, who was referred to as King Charles' royal chaplain and personal confessor by a document issued in the Kingdom of Naples on 7 January 1316. He was an envoy of the king in this capacity. After the coronation of Pope John XXII, the Hungarian king sent his envoys, Dominican friar Peter and the Franciscan friar Jánki to Avignon to greet him in the spring of 1317. Among other issues, Charles requested the pope to appoint Jánki as the Archbishop of Kalocsa, which has not been filled for years. Peter became the new Bishop of Bosnia, while Jánki – as the candidate of the Hungarian monarch – was appointed his superior, the Archbishop of Kalocsa by Pope John XXII on 3 July 1317, after the annulment of the former election of Demetrius Vicsadoli. Simultaneously, Jánki also became the chancellor of the royal court, holding both dignities until his death. He was consecrated as bishop by Nicolò Albertini, the Cardinal-bishop of Ostia in the papal court on 15 August 1317 and was granted his pallium too by four additional cardinals. Jánki paid his servitium commune (2,000 golden florins) to the Roman Curia in two installments in the spring of 1319.

== Archbishop of Kalocsa ==
Jánki returned to Hungary by 23 October 1317. Joining the royal army, he participated in the siege of Komárom (now Komárno in Slovakia); Charles' troops successfully captured the fort from the powerful oligarch Matthew Csák in November. The king concluded a short-lived peace with the oligarch. After Charles neglected to reclaim Church property that Matthew Csák had seized by force, the prelates of the realm – archbishops Thomas, Ladislaus Jánki and their eleven suffragans – summoned a national synod to Kalocsa and made an alliance in the spring of 1318 against all who would jeopardize their interests. There, Jánki also issued a testimony letter on Matthew Csák's ecclesiastical punishment, who was excommunicated by John, Bishop of Nyitra prior to that. Jánki remained a partisan of Charles I, but not without conditions. Several lands of his diocese was unlawfully seized by Serbian king Stefan Milutin and various Hungarian nobles in the previous years. The prelates entrusted Ladislaus Kórógyi, Bishop of Pécs and Ivánka, Bishop of Várad to inform the royal court on the resolutions of their synod. Upon their demand, Charles summoned a diet immediately to the field of Rákos in summer and commissioned his ispáns and castellans to recover Church property in their territory. Returning to Kalocsa, they informed Jánki on Charles' resolutions. Thereafter, Jánki invited the majority of prelates to hold another meeting in the territory of his archbishopric, at Apostag in July 1318. They protested against Charles, who confiscated the castle of Győr from the Diocese of Győr before that for military strategic reasons. The prelates arrived to the diet from Apostag and jointly represented their interests against the monarch and the secular barons. Before the end of the year, the prelates made a complaint to the Holy See against Charles because he had taken possession of Church property. Jánki was made conservator of the Knights Hospitaller in Hungary in 1319. According to historian Ildikó Tóth, the close cooperation between the prelates lasted until the death of Archbishop Thomas in early 1321; he was succeeded by the king's brother-in-law, Boleslaus. Jánki remained a strong pillar of Charles' reign, but also defended his province's interest. Charles, in contrast, did not even want to share his power with his own faithful church dignitaries.

Pope John appointed Jánki as conservator of the Pauline friars living in Hungary and the neighboring countries in 1322. The pope opposed the Franciscan understanding of the poverty of Christ and his apostles. He was determined to suppress what he considered to be the excesses of the Spirituals, who contended eagerly for the view that Christ and his apostles had possessed absolutely nothing, either separately or jointly, and who were citing Exiit qui seminat in support of their view. In March 1322, he commissioned experts to examine the idea of poverty based on belief that Christ and the apostles owned nothing. Ladislaus Jánki was among those theologians, who were invited to the papal court at Avignon to participate in the discussion. The experts disagreed among themselves, but the majority condemned the idea on the grounds that it would condemn the Church's right to have possessions. According to the surviving records, Jánki argued in favor of the joint possession of goods by Christ and the apostles, referring to various parts of the Bible (for instance, Jn 13,27–28, Jn 4,8 and Lk 22,36). Considering the majority opinion of his order, however, he refused to call heretics those Franciscan friars, who insisted that Jesus and the apostles did not possess anything, but he was willing to submit himself to the will of the pope if he declares the advertisers of opposite doctrines to be heretics. Historian László Tóth argued Jánki's alleged participation in this discussion is only narrated by Károly Péterfy in his work "Sacra Concilia Ecclesiae Romano-Catholicae in Regno Hungariae" (1741) due to a paleographic error, which information was later taken over by later historians (e.g. Vilmos Fraknói and József Udvardy). According to this argument, the papal document, in fact, refers to Balianus (Belian), the Archbishop of Colossa.

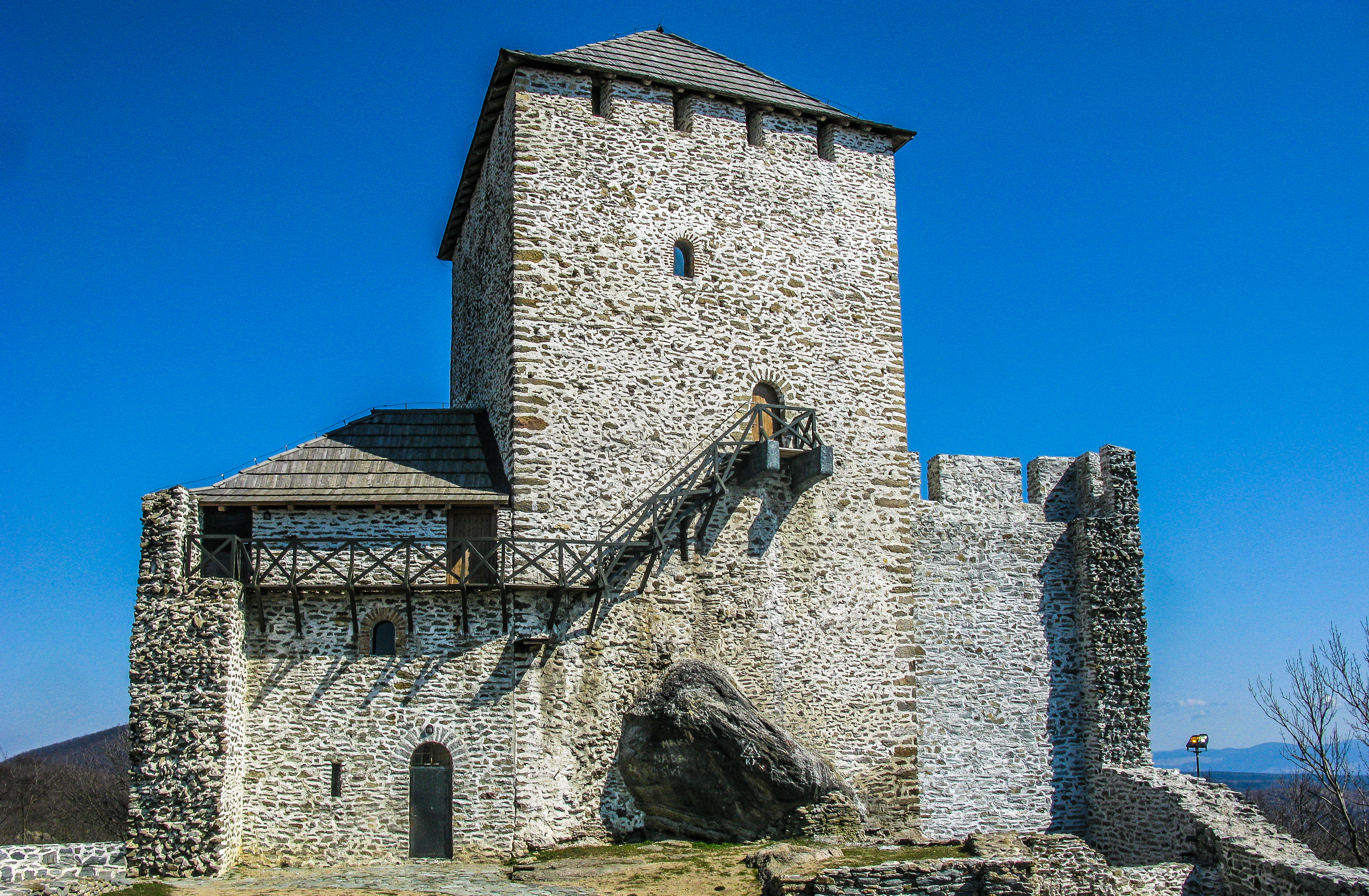
Vršac Castle (also Érsomlyó), owned by the Jánki family in the 14th century

Jánki acted as arbiter in various lawsuits over domestic ecclesiastical affairs during his episcopate. He had a mandate to mediate the dispute between Archbishop Thomas and the burghers of Esztergom in 1320. Jánki was one of the four prelates, who excommunicated John, abbot of Pilis and monk Nicholas for their violent actions against the parsonage of Budakalász in September 1326. Alongside Archbishop Boleslaus, he co-judged over the dispute between the cathedral chapter of Veszprém and the Zala Abbey in spring 1327. Pope John XXII commissioned Jánki to send detailed summary about the Paulines in Hungary on 1 July 1327. Prior to that, the monastic order consisted of sixty monasteries in the kingdom and Charles requested the Holy See to confirm the adoption of the Rule of St. Augustine to the Pauline Order. In the same year, Jánki absolved Ladislaus Kaboli from his excommunication upon the order of the pope. Under Jánki's episcopate, the bishopric of Nándorfehérvár (Belgrade) was restored and subordinated to the Archdiocese of Kalocsa following Charles' successful military campaign against Stefan Milutin, when the Hungarian troops retook Belgrade and restored their suzerainty over Macsó. Jánki exchanged the archbishopric's lands in Hont and Gömör counties (including Rimaszombat, today Rimavská Sobota, Slovakia) for possessions in Bács and Syrmia counties with the influential lord Thomas Szécsényi in 1334. Later, Jánki's successors considered it a disadvantageous contract and blamed the late archbishop that he had exchanged rich estates in Upper Hungary for humble uninhabited lands in the southern frontier; they have been trying to recover the lost goods for decades. Due to the contribution of the Roman Curia, Nicholas Apáti successfully recovered the lost estates in 1357. As archbishop, Jánki owned the royal castles of Krassova and Érsomlyó (present-day Carașova in Romania and Vršac in Serbia, respectively) as "office fiefs" (or honors). Upon the contribution of Ladislaus Jánki, Charles I donated the lordship of Nagylak to his relative, Nicholas the "Lesser".

Jánki accompanied Charles I to the Kingdom of Naples in the summer of 1333 and stayed there until early 1334. He conducted negotiations with one Voivode Bogdan, son of Mikola, on King Charles's behalf about the movement of the voivode and his people "from his country" (Serbia or Wallachia) to Hungary between the autumn of 1334 and the summer of 1335. A royal charter, dated to 6 October 1335, narrated that Charles had sent Jánki, to Clisura Dunării three times in 1334 and 1335 to make preparations for the movement of Bogdan. Historian Pál Engel says that Voivode Bogdan led a large group of Vlachs from Serbia to Hungary on this occasion. Charles, who was ailing during the last years of his life, sought to secure the undisturbed inheritance of the throne for his son, Louis. In 1333, the monarch requested Pope John XXII to declare that the coronation ceremony must be performed by the archbishop of Esztergom, unless his possible illness or absence. In this case, Charles requested the pope to have the opportunity for Ladislaus Jánki, Andrew Báthory, Bishop of Várad and Ladislaus Kaboli, Bishop of Zagreb, all of them were his royal dynasty's faithful partisans, to celebrate the event. This reflects the situation well, despite all previous disagreements, Jánki remained mainstay to the king in the coming decades. Pope John agreed to the request, conditional on its one-off and individuality, on 31 July 1333. However, Jánki predeceased his lord sometime between October 1336 and March 1337.

== Sources ==
- Engel, Pál (1996). Magyarország világi archontológiája, 1301–1457, I. [Secular Archontology of Hungary, 1301–1457, Volume I] (in Hungarian). História, MTA Történettudományi Intézete. ISBN 963-8312-44-0.
- Maléth, Ágnes (2020). A Magyar Királyság és a Szentszék kapcsolata I. Károly korában (1301–1342) [The Relationship of the Hungarian Kingdom and the Holy See in the time of Charles I (1301–1342)] (in Hungarian). Pécsi Tudományegyetem BTK TTI Középkori és Koraújkori Történeti Tanszék. ISBN 978-963-429-500-6.
- Markó, László (2006). A magyar állam főméltóságai Szent Istvántól napjainkig: Életrajzi Lexikon [Great Officers of State in Hungary from King Saint Stephen to Our Days: A Biographical Encyclopedia] (in Hungarian). Helikon Kiadó. ISBN 963-208-970-7.
- Tóth, Ildikó (2007). "Adalékok Jánki László kalocsai érsek életrajzához [Contributions to the Biography of Ladislaus Jánki, Archbishop of Kalocsa]". In Révész, Éva; Halmágyi, Miklós (eds.). Középkortörténti tanulmányok. Az V. Medievisztikai PhD-konferencia (Szeged, 2007. június 7–8.) előadásai (in Hungarian). University of Szeged. pp. 203–209. ISBN 978-963-482-851-8.
- Udvardy, József (1991). A kalocsai érsekek életrajza (1000–1526) [Biographies of Archbishops of Kalocsa, 1000–1526] (in Hungarian). Görres Gesellschaft.

Ladislaus House of Jánki Born: ? Died: October 1336/March 1337
Catholic Church titles
Preceded by Demetrius Vicsadoli elected	Archbishop of Kalocsa; 1317–1336/7	Succeeded by Ladislaus Kaboli
Political offices
Preceded by Vincent	Chancellor; 1317–1336/7	Succeeded by Stephen Harkácsi
