= Roman Catholic Diocese of Srijem =

Roman Catholic diocese in Serbia

Diocese of Srijem Dioecesis Sirmiensis Srijemska biskupija Сремска бискупија

Catholic
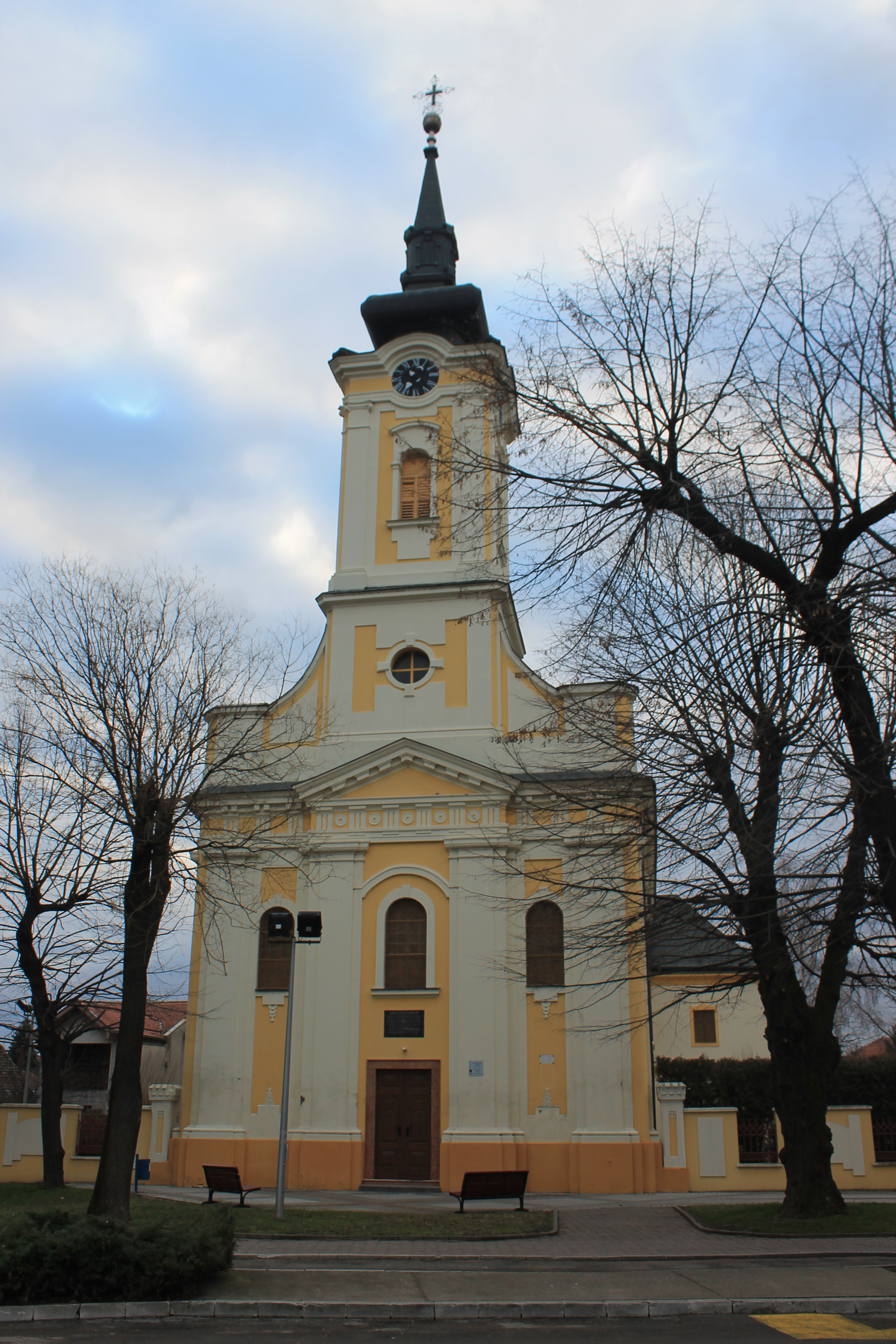
- Cathedral of St. Demetrius, Sremska Mitrovica

Location
- Country: Serbia
- Ecclesiastical province: Đakovo-Osijek
- Metropolitan: Archdiocese of Đakovo-Osijek

Statistics
- Area: 3,988 km^{2} (1,540 sq mi)
- Population: Total; Catholics: (as of 2022); ▼563,241; ▼15,224 (▼2.7%)

Information
- Denomination: Catholic Church
- Sui iuris church: Latin Church
- Rite: Roman Rite
- Established: 1229
- Cathedral: Cathedral of St. Demetrius, Sremska Mitrovica

Current leadership
- Pope: Leo XIV
- Bishop: Fabijan Svalina
- Metropolitan Archbishop: Đuro Hranić
- Bishops emeritus: Đuro Gašparović

Map
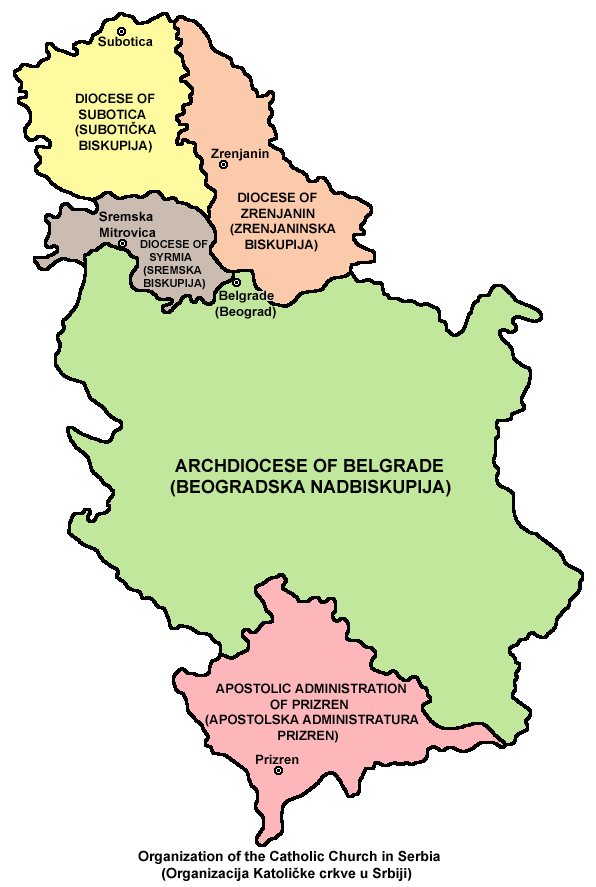

Website
- srijembiskupija.rs

The Diocese of Srijem (Latin: Dioecesis Sirmiensis; Croatian: Srijemska biskupija; Serbian: Сремска бискупија) is the Latin Church archdiocese of the Catholic Church in Serbia, covering Serbian part of Syrmia region (Note: including municipalities of Zemun and Surčin which are part of administrative territory of City of Belgrade as well as municipalities of Beočin, Sremski Karlovci, and parts of City of Novi Sad that are geographically part of Syrmia but are administratively part of the South Bačka District.). It is a suffragan diocese in the ecclesiastical province of the Archdiocese of Đakovo-Osijek. The episcopal see is located at the Cathedral of St. Demetrius in Sremska Mitrovica.

== History ==
Diocese of Syrmia was created upon the request of Ugrin Csák, Archbishop of Kalocsa in 1229. It became a suffragan bishopric of the Hungarian church administration.

In 1521, after the fall of Belgrade, the region of Syrmia was overrun by Ottomans. The Latin Church continued to appoint bishops for Syrmia, but they were living mainly outside their diocese. During the Austro-Turkish wars of (1683–1699) and (1716–1718), entire region of Syrmia was liberated from Ottoman rule and incorporated into the Habsburg monarchy. In 1773, the Diocese of Syrmia and Diocese of Bosnia and Đakovo were joined into a single enlarged diocese that was named the Diocese of Bosnia-Đakovo and Syrmia.

In 1918, the region was incorporated into newly formed Kingdom of Serbs, Croats, and Slovenes, later known as Yugoslavia. In 1945, region of Syrmia became part of Serbia within Yugoslavia. In 1963, name of the diocese was changed to Diocese of Đakovo or Bosnia and Srijem. After the breakup of Yugoslavia (1991–1992) there were several initiatives towards the renewal of the separate Diocese of Srijem.

On 15 July 1999 the Holy See created the territory with a special authority to govern the Serbian part of the Diocese of Djakovo or Bosna and Srijem and on 1 October 1999 was established as a General Vicariate for Srijem with the residence in Petrovaradin.

In 2008 the Diocese of Đakovo or Bosnia and Srijem was divided into two administrative units: the Archdiocese of Đakovo-Osijek and the Diocese of Srijem. The current bishop is Fabijan Svalina, appointed in 2024.

== List of bishops ==
- Innocent (1232)
- Oliver (1250–1262)
- John (1262–1269)
- Pouka (1277–1293)
- Nicholas (1299–1300)
- Vincent (?–1306)
- Petar (around 1374)
- Konrad Schnosputger, O.S.A. (26 Jul 1433 – 1436)
- Giacomo Piceno, O.F.M. (1454–1459)
- Orbán (22 Apr 1460–1465)
- Miklós Báthori (8 Jan 1473 – 22 Apr 1474)
- Zsigmond Palóczy (5 Apr 1475 – 1479)
- Boldizsár (25 Jun 1479 – 1481)
- János Vitéz (31 Mar 1482 – 3 Jun 1489)
- Stjepan Crispo (26 Feb 1490 – )
- Mikuláš Csáky (de Bačka) (29 Apr 1499 – 5 Jun 1501)
- Gabril Polgar (30 May 1502 – )
- István de Szatmar (2 Sep 1502 – 1505)
- János Ország de Guth (1505–1520)
- László de Macedonia (Dec 1520–1526)
- Stjepan Brodarić (11 Mar 1526 – 30 May 1539)
- Márton Pethe de Hetes (1582 – 26 Oct 1583)
- Štefan da Trnava, O.S.P.P.E. (20 Mar 1589 – 1592)
- Miklós Zelniczey Naprady (1593 – 17 Jun 1596)
- Šimun Bratulić, O.S.P.P.E. (15 Jan 1601 – 13 Sep 1604)
- László Majthényi (18 May 1616 – 1624)
- Francesco Jany (1 Jul 1697 – Apr 1702)
- Joseph Antoine Marie Favini, O.F.M. Conv. (14 May 1703 – 22 Nov 1717)
- Franjo Vernić (22 Nov 1717 – 27 Jun 1729)
- Gabriel Patačić (12 Feb 1731 – 28 Sep 1733)
- Ladislav Szörényi (15 Feb 1734 – 13 Nov 1752)
- Nicolò Givovich (13 Nov 1752 – 16 May 1762)
- Ivan Krstitelj Paxy (20 Dec 1762 – 10 Sep 1770)
- Đuro Gašparović (18 June 2008 – 14 February 2024)
- Fabijan Svalina (14 February 2024 – present)

== See also ==
- Catholic Church in Serbia
- List of Catholic dioceses in Serbia

== Another sources ==
- Magyar katolikus lexikon I–XV. Főszerk. Diós István; szerk. Viczián János. Budapest: Szent István Társulat. 1993–2010., list of bishops:
