= Cathedral of St. Demetrius, Sremska Mitrovica =

Coordinates: 44.9675°N 19.6067°E

Cathedral of St. Demetrius
- Катедрала Светог Димитрија; Katedrala Svetog Dimitrija
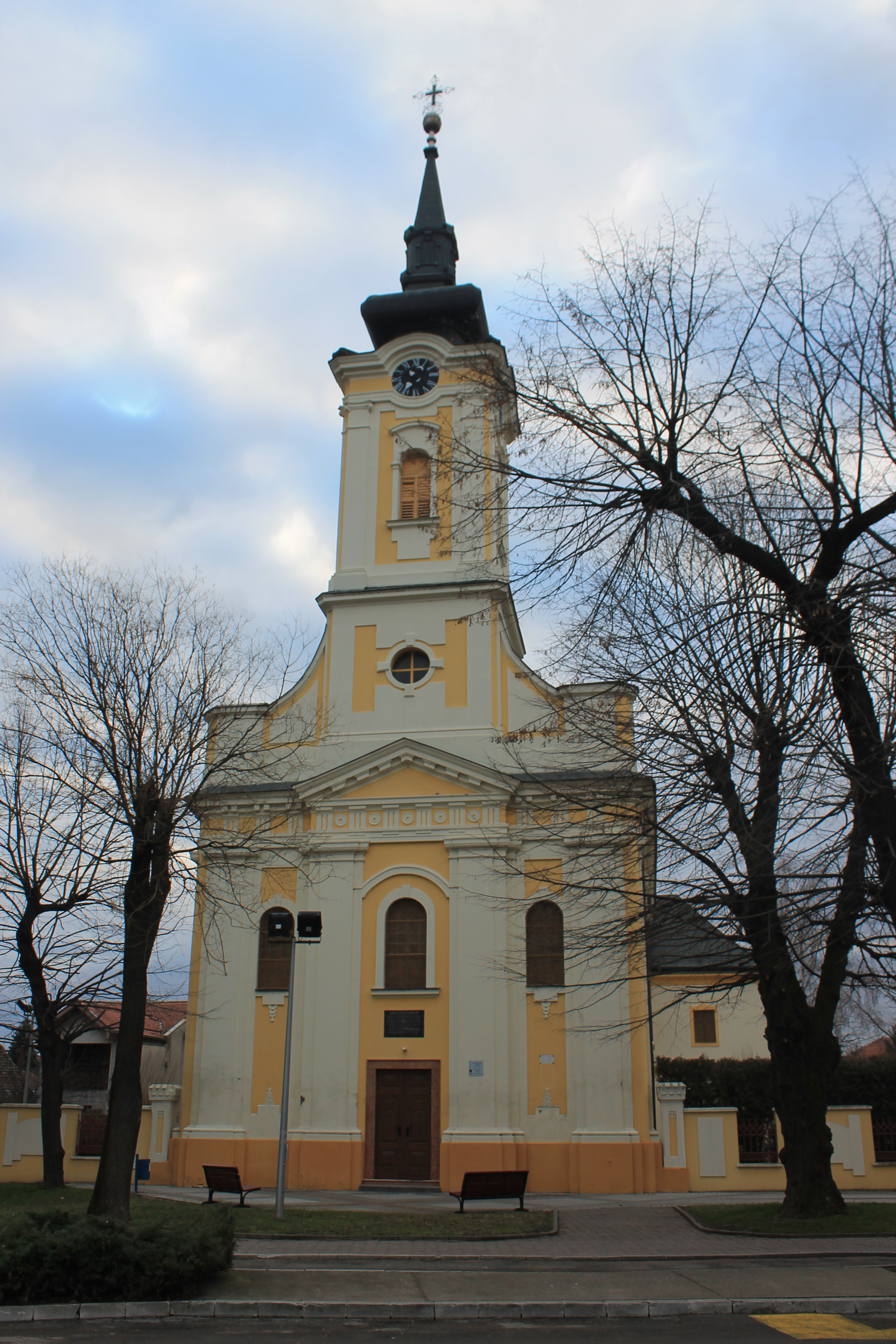
- Cathedral of St. Demetrius, pictured in 2018
- Cathedral of St. Demetrius
- Location: Sremska Mitrovica
- Country: Serbia
- Denomination: Roman Catholic Church

Administration
- Diocese: Diocese of Srijem

The Cathedral of St. Demetrius (Serbian: Катедрала Светог Димитрија, romanized: Katedrala Svetog Dimitrija), also known as the Sremska Mitrovica Catholic Cathedral, is the Roman Catholic church and minor basilica in Sremska Mitrovica, Serbia. It is under jurisdiction of the Diocese of Srijem and serves as its cathedral church.

== History ==
The current church was built in 1810 and dedicated on 30 June of that year to Saint Demetrius of Sirmium, who is the patron saint of the city. It was elevated to the status of co-cathedral in 1984, and a minor basilica in 1991. With the restoration of the Diocese of Srijem in 2008, the church was elevated to the status of cathedral.

== Architecture ==
The cathedral is a single-nave structure built in the Neoclassical style, rectangular in shape with a rounded altar apse. The side façades are articulated with shallow pilasters featuring Doric capitals and windows with segmental arches. On the right side, it has an attached sacristy of irregular cubic shape, while on the left there is a smaller room where the Holy Sepulcher is permanently set up.

The baroque high altar once displayed a painting of Saint Demetrius by Arsa Teodorović, later replaced by the statue still in place. Also on the high altar are statues of Saint Joseph and Saint Mark. The side altars are dedicated to the Our Lady of the Rosary and the Holy Trinity.

== See also ==
- Catholic Church in Serbia
- List of cathedrals in Serbia
