= Mattiana =

Titular Roman Catholic diocese

Africa Proconsularis (125 AD)

Mattiana was a Roman-Berber civitas in the province of Africa Proconsularis. The locale existed during late antiquity, and was situated in northern Tunisia.

In antiquity, the town was also the seat of a Catholic bishopric, suffragan of the Archdiocese of Carthage. The historical sources mention only one known bishop, Marcellus, who took part in the Council of Carthage of 646. Today Mattiana survives as a titular bishopric of the Roman Catholic Church and the current bishop is José Eugenio Ramos Delgado, of Monterrey, who succeeds Carlos Alberto Salcedo Ojeda of Huancayo, in 2026.
