= Malé Borové =

- Municipality
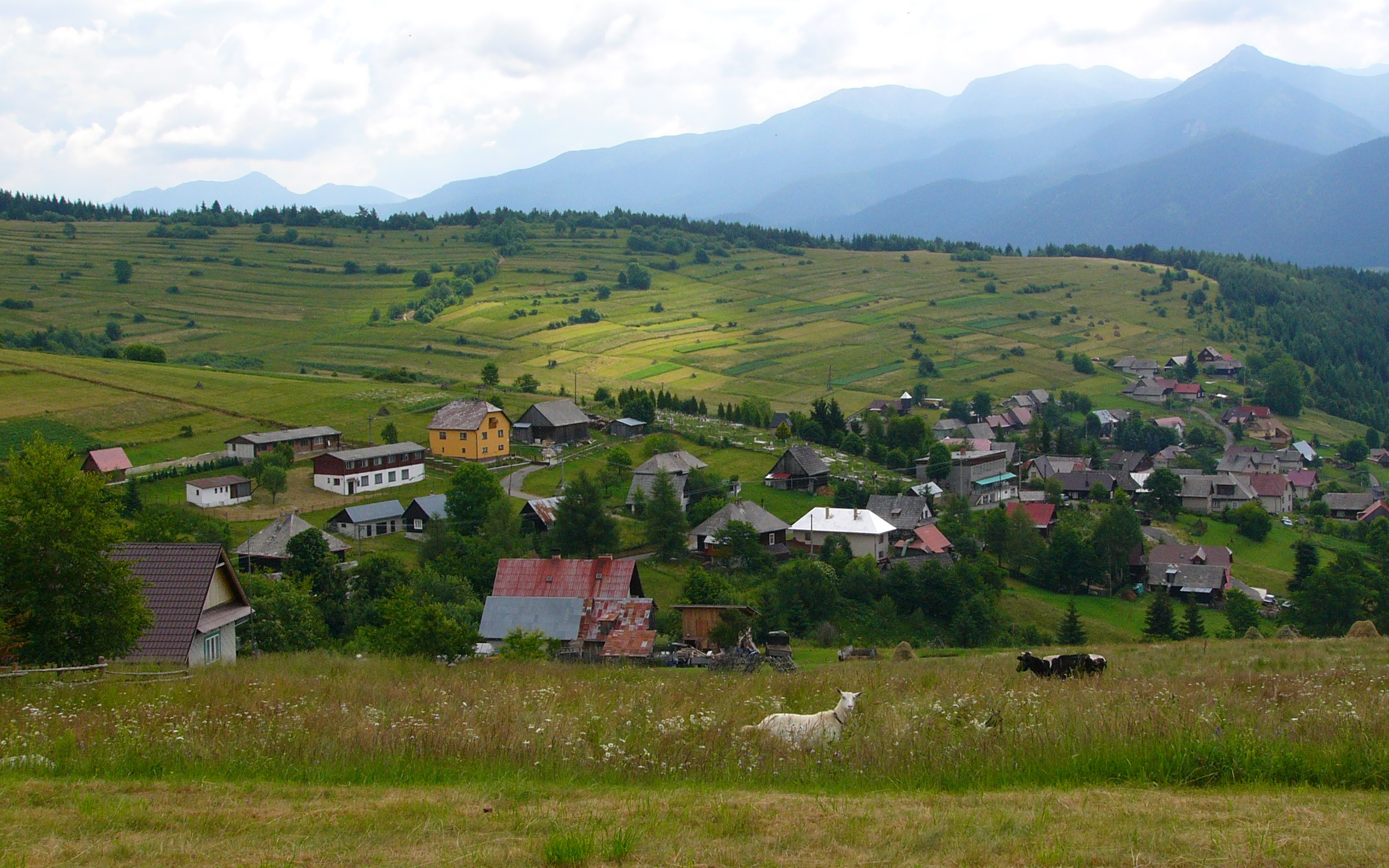

- Flag

- Location of Malé Borové in the Žilina Region Location of Malé Borové in Slovakia
- Coordinates: 49.23°N 19.53°E
- Country: Slovakia
- Region: Žilina Region
- District: Liptovský Mikuláš District
- First mentioned: 1550

Government
  - Mayor: Helena Tkáčová (ĽSNS)

Area
  - Total: 5.83 km^{2} (2.25 sq mi)
- Elevation: 885 m (2,904 ft)

Population (2025)
  - Total: 112
- Time zone: UTC+1 (CET)
  - Summer (DST): UTC+2 (CEST)
- Postal code: 274 6
- Area code: +421 44
- Vehicle registration plate (until 2022): LM
- Website: maleborove.sk

Malé Borové (Hungarian: Kisborove, Polish: Małe Borowe) is a village and municipality in Liptovský Mikuláš District in the Žilina Region of northern Slovakia.

== History ==
In historical records the village was first mentioned in 1550. Before the establishment of independent Czechoslovakia in 1918, it was part of Liptó County within the Kingdom of Hungary. In the 1880s, it had a population 480, Polish and Slovak by ethnicity. From 1939 to 1945, it was part of the Slovak Republic.

== Geography ==
The municipality lies at an altitude of 885 metres (2,904 ft) and covers an area of 5.83 km^{2} (2.25 sq mi) (2025).

== Population ==
Population statistic (10 years)
Year	1995	2005	2015	2025
Count	254	198	138	112
Difference		−22.04%	−30.30%	−18.84%

Population statistic
Year	2024	2025
Count	111	112
Difference		+0.90%

It has a population of 112 people (31 December 2025).

=== Ethnicity ===
Census 2021 (1+ %)
Ethnicity	Number	Fraction
Slovak	122	98.38%
Not found out	4	3.22%
Total	124	

In year 2021 was 124 people by ethnicity 122 as Slovak, 4 as Not found out, 1 as Czech and 1 as Russian.

Note on population: The difference values of population numbers in the table "Population statistic" and in the sections "Ethnicity" & "Religion" is caused by the use of various statistical methods.

=== Religion ===
Census 2021 (1+ %)
Religion	Number	Fraction
Roman Catholic Church	110	88.71%
None	10	8.06%
Not found out	2	1.61%
Evangelical Church	2	1.61%
Total	124	

In year 2021 was 124 people by religion 110 from Roman Catholic Church, 10 from None, 2 from Not found out and 2 from Evangelical Church.
