= Maria of Bytom =

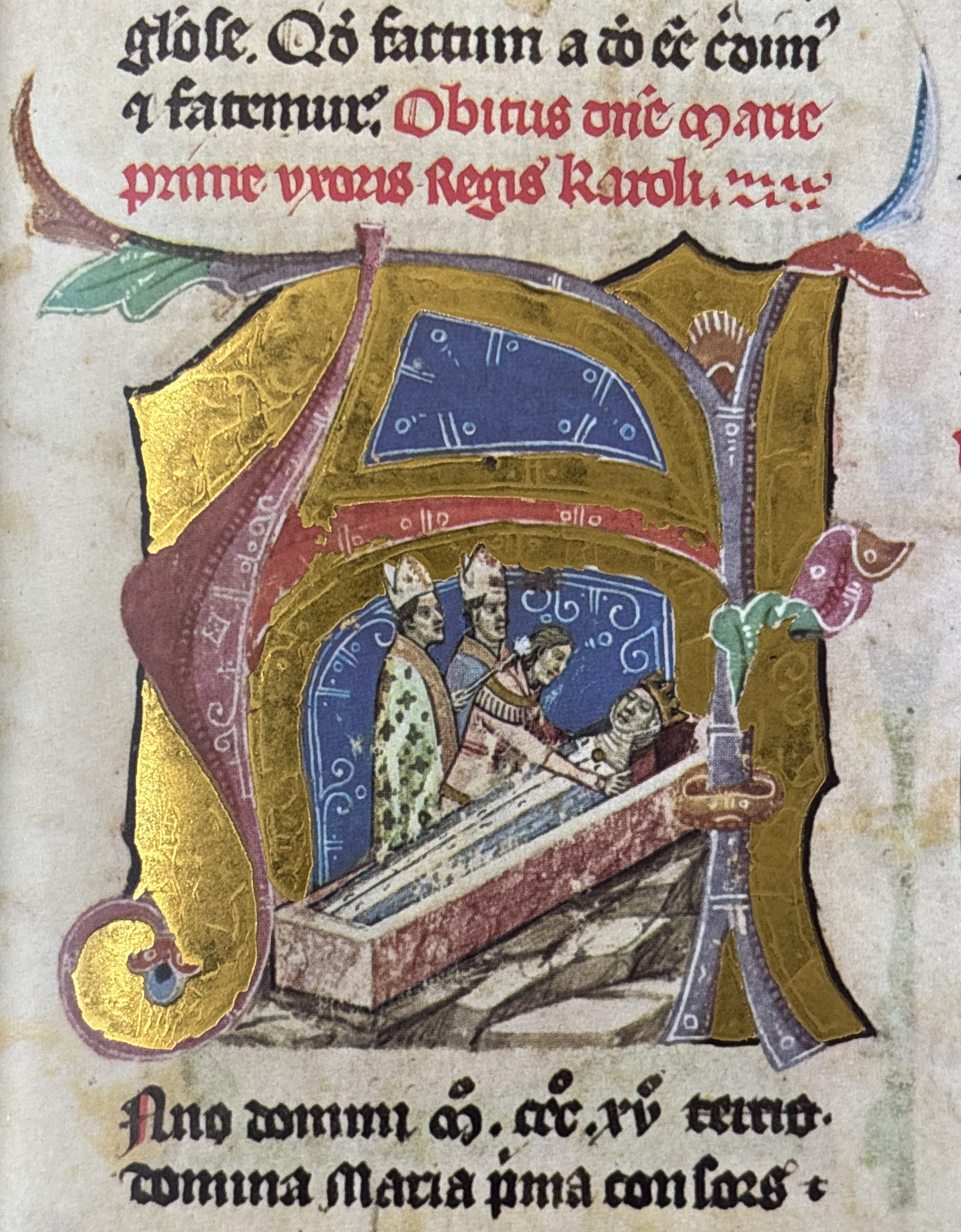
- The funeral of Maria of Bytom, miniature from the Chronicon Pictum

Queen consort of Hungary
- Tenure: 1306–1317
- Born: before 1295
- Died: 15 December 1317 (aged 22); Temesvár, Hungary
- Burial: Székesfehérvár Basilica
- Spouse: Charles I of Hungary
- Issue: Catherine, Duchess of Świdnica? Elisabeth, Duchess of Niemodlin?
- House: Piast
- Father: Casimir of Bytom
- Mother: Helena

Maria of Bytom (Polish: Maria bytomska; before 1295 – 15 December 1317) was a Queen of Hungary by marriage to Charles I of Hungary.

She was the third child and only daughter of Duke Casimir of Bytom by his wife Helena, whose origins are unknown, although the later historiography tends to recognize her as a daughter of Lev I of Galicia, from the Rurikid dynasty.

Maria was the first or second wife of Charles I Robert of Anjou, King of Hungary. This union was childless, but older literature claimed that they had two daughters. Little is known about the activities of Mary as Queen of Hungary. Her marriage to Charles I Robert consolidated the Polish-Hungarian agreement directed against the Kingdom of Bohemia, and also helped to establish a close Polish-Hungarian relations in the 14th century, reflected in the ecclesiastical career in Hungary of Maria's brothers, Bolesław and Mieszko, and the later third marriage of Charles I Robert with Elizabeth of Kujavia.

== Life ==
=== Birth ===
The exact date of birth of Maria is unknown. In 1306, when she was married to Charles Robert, contemporary Canon Law established that the minimal age for marriage must be at least 12 years old; thus, she was born in 1294 at the latest. She was the first member of the Silesian branch of the Piast dynasty named Maria; reasons for this suggestion of name are also unknown. Among the children of Casimir of Bytom she was usually placed in the sixth and last place, but she could even be born as the third child, in turn.

=== Queen ===
Information about the wedding of Maria and Charles I Robert of Hungary was shown in the chronicle of Jan Długosz, who reported two different dates for this event: 1306 and 1310. The first date is generally accepted by the majority of historians: as proof, the first known document who called Maria Queen of Hungary was dated 23 June 1306; in addition, the official Hungarian documents from 1306 explicitly named her as Queen. Finally, it's anticipated that the loan 140 pieces of fine silver dragged around 1305 by Casimir of Bytom were used to cover the costs of the wedding of Maria and Charles I Robert. In both reports about the wedding, Długosz mentions the beauty of Maria, stating that the Silesian Piast princess was a "very pretty girl" and "the girl famous for her extraordinary beauty". The marriage was probably on the initiative of Władysław I the Elbow-high (first-cousin of Maria's father), and the role of matchmaker was played by her brother Bolesław, then Scholastic of Kraków and Duke of Toszek. The wedding ceremony took place probably in Bytom, the homeland of the bride. After arriving to Hungary and in accordance with the almost century-old custom, Maria was crowned Queen of Hungary by Benedict Rád, Bishop of Veszprém in Székesfehérvár.

This union was the external expression of the approximation between the Polish and Hungarian kingdoms, connected to the transition of the House of Anjou politics in close political relations with Poland. In addition, the Duchy of Bytom, now closely associated to the anti-Czech party, could get out of its feudal relationship with the Kingdom of Bohemia. Charles I Robert also strengthened his position as competitor for the Hungarian throne against Otto III of Bavaria thanks to his marriage, because (as was assumed by historians), his wife was closely related to the House of Arpad: Maria's mother Helena was granddaughter of King Bela IV of Hungary through her mother. The position of Maria as Queen of Hungary also paved the way for the subsequent career in the Hungarian church of his brothers Bolesław (later Archbishop of Esztergom) and Mieszko (later Bishop of Nitra and Veszprém).

Little is known about the role of Maria in the Hungarian royal court. There are only two documents issued by it. The first, from 1312, has survived until today together with the stamp. The content of the second, from 9 April 1313, is known as the confirmation of the Chapter in Székesfehérvár. The obverse of the seal's image of Maria showed the Queen sitting on a throne with floral envelope and the letter M and A in both sides, while positioned on the back of the customary double cross and the letters Angevin RI and A between her shoulders. The letters on both sides of the seal consists of the name of the queen.

Maria died on 15 December 1317 in Temesvár (now Timișoara, Romania) and was buried in the Royal vault of Székesfehérvár in the Basilica of the Virgin Mary, according to the reports of Jan Długosz. The Polish chronicler confirms this facts with the Hungarian sources, but they provide three different dates of Maria's death: 1315, 1316 or 1317. The third date is now accepted as the definitive one thanks to a document issued by Charles I Robert dated 24 February 1317, in which Maria is still mentioned as a living person. The resulting differences about the date in documents in charters could be explained as a mistake of the writer, who didn't place correctly the last number – rather than MCCCXVII he wrote MCCCXV and MCCCXVI. The picture of her funeral placed at the head of this article was a miniature of the Chronicon Pictum, who was currently preserved in the National Library in Budapest.

After the death of Maria, Charles I Robert married Beatrice of Luxembourg in 1318, who died the following year in childbirth, and married lastly Elizabeth of Kujavia in 1320, who finally bore him the needed male-heirs of the dynasty.

== Issue ==
The union between Maria and Charles I Robert was childless, probably because of the Queen's infertility. Older literature attributed to this union two daughters:

1. Catherine (d. 1355), married in 1338 to Duke Henry II of Świdnica; their only child, Anne of Świdnica, was later Holy Roman Empress by her marriage with Charles IV of Luxembourg.
2. Elisabeth (d. by 19 August 1367), married a "Bolesław of Opole" (probably Duke Bolesław II of Niemodlin).

The existence of this two daughters as offspring of Maria of Bytom, supported by a group of Polish and foreign historians, headed by the genealogist Włodzimierz Dworzaczek, was recently challenged and rejected by historians.

During Maria's lifetime, her husband had an illegitimate son, Coloman, born by the end of 1317 or early in 1318. The mother was a certain Guze (or Elisabeth) Csák, a daughter of George Csák. This son followed a Church career, and was in Bishop of Győr from 1337 to 1375.

Maria of Bytom House of Piast Born: before 1295 Died: 1317
Royal titles
Preceded by Viola Elisabeth of Cieszyn	Queen consort of Hungary; 1306–1317	Succeeded by Beatrice of Luxembourg
