= Mieszko of Bytom =

Silesian noble and bishop

Mieszko
- Duke of Siewierz, Bishop of Nitra and Veszprém
- Coat-of-arms of Upper silesia (Cieszyn, Bytom, Strzelce)
- Born: c. 1305
- Died: bef. 9 August 1344
- Noble family: Silesian Piasts
- Father: Casimir of Bytom
- Mother: Helena (of Galicia?)

Mieszko of Bytom (b. ca. 1305 – d. bef. 9 August 1344), was a Duke of Siewierz during 1312–1328 (from 1315 only formally), Bishop of Nitra 1328–1334 and Bishop of Veszprém from 1334 to his death.

He was the fifth and youngest son of Duke Casimir of Bytom by his wife Helena.

== Life ==
As the youngest son, Mieszko was destined to the clergy since his early childhood. Nevertheless, after his father's death in 1312 he received the town of Siewierz, but he continued his church career and in 1313 he joined to the Knights Hospitaller.

Two years later (in 1315) Mieszko, together with his older brother Bolesław, traveled to Hungary, at the request of their sister Queen Maria and soon after his arrival, Mieszko was appointed Hungarian Prior of the Knights Hospitaller; however, three years later, in 1318, he resigned from that dignity at the express command of the Pope. After his resignation as a prior, Mieszko remained as a faithful supporter of his brother Bolesław, who in return rewarded his fidelity in 1328, when he obtained for Mieszko the dignity of Bishop of Nitra. This happened despite the opposition of the local Chapter, who were completely against the nepotism; however, the full support shown to the Piast princes by the King Charles I Robert and his new wife Queen Elizabeth (Queen Maria died in 1317) ended this dispute with a complete success to Mieszko, who, in order to assume the rule over the bishopric, finally decided to resign his Duchy of Siewierz on behalf of his brother Władysław.

The government of Mieszko over Nitra wasn't easy. Despite all the problems, he was completely involved in activities who raised the importance of his episcopal city, and decided to start his rule with huge impetus, built a new cathedral (who was completed after his death in 1355).

In 1334, and after years of continuous conflict with the Chapter, Mieszko was named Bishop of Veszprém (this time with the consent of the Pope and the local nobility). During this time, he also held the position of chancellor of Queen Elisabeth of Hungary (who certainly was involved in the election of Mieszko as Bishop), who bought him important benefits (Mieszko received from Federal Chancellery the amount of 500 fines per year by orders of Queen Elisabeth).

During the last years of his life, Mieszko continued with his close cooperation with the Hungarian House of Anjou. In 1342 he participated in the coronation of the new King Louis, who also remained in close contact.

Mieszko died in 1344 and was buried in the cathedral of Veszprém.

== See also ==
Regnal titles
Preceded by Casimir	Duke of Siewierz; 1312–1328	Succeeded by Władysław
