= Bolesław of Toszek =

Duke of Toszek

- Archbishop of Esztergom
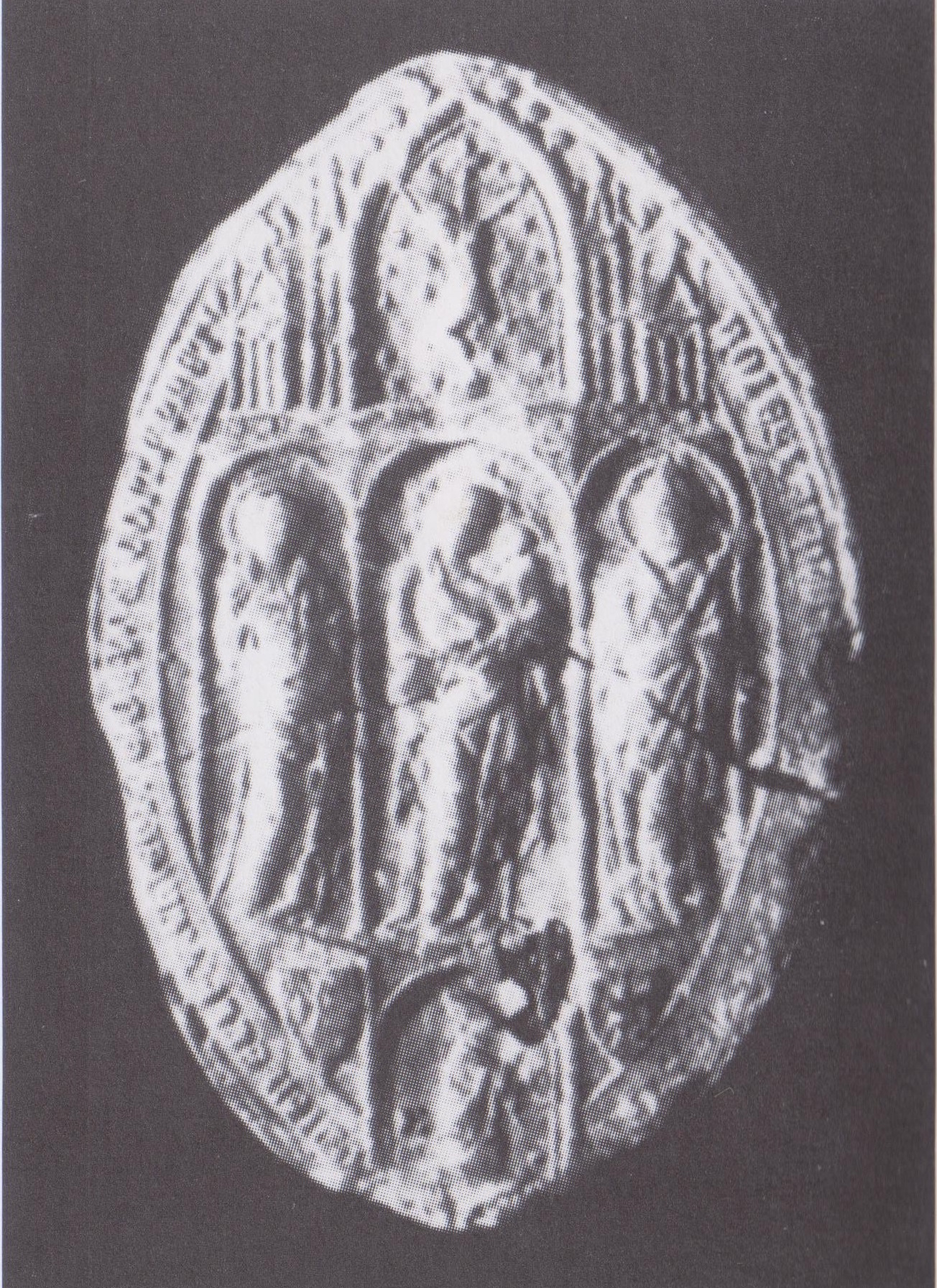
- Seal of Archbishop Bolesław
- Installed: 1321
- Term ended: 1328
- Predecessor: Thomas
- Successor: Nicholas Dörögdi (elected)
- Other post: Duke of Toszek

Orders
- Consecration: 5 December 1321 by Berengar Fredol

Personal details
- Born: c. 1278
- Died: December 1328
- Denomination: Roman Catholic
- Parents: Casimir of Bytom; Helena

Bolesław of Toszek (Hungarian: Boleszláv; 1276/78 – December 1328), was a Duke of Toszek from 1303 to his death (after 1315 only formally) and Archbishop of Esztergom from 1321.

== Early career ==
Bolesław was born around 1278 into the Silesian Piasts, as the oldest son of Duke Casimir of Bytom by his wife Helena. He was designed by his father to the Church career, despite the fact that he was the eldest son. Already in 1294 he was appointed Scholastic of Kraków, and three years later (in 1297), obtained the title of Canon of the Chapter of Wrocław. A bull of Pope John XXII referred to Bolesław's "literacy in sciences". Hungarian historian Antal Pór considered that he is identical with that namesake provost of Opole, who functioned as rector of the ultramontanes at the University of Padua in May 1308. Polish historian Stanisław Sroka called Pór's argument as hypothesis, but agreed, Bolesław may have been a student of an universitas in Italy, taking into account his Italian language skills and later diplomatic missions to the peninsula.

Despite his church career, in 1303 Bolesław received from his father the town of Toszek years duchy, which formally remained under his rule until his death (although the real government of that land, after Bolesław's departure to Hungary, was performed by his younger brother Władysław). After departing to Hungary, he gave up his former benefices in Poland, but still used the title of Duke of Toszek in his documents, albeit sporadically.

== Archbishop of Esztergom ==
=== Diplomatic missions ===
Around 1315 Bolesław, at the request of his sister, Queen Maria of Hungary, moved to the court of his brother-in-law King Charles I Robert in Buda; however, his career in the Hungarian hierarchy only began thanks to the efforts of Queen Elizabeth, Charles I's third and last wife (Queen Maria died in 1317). At the end of 1320, Bolesław went to the Kraków court, and at the beginning of the next year (1321) the King Charles I gave him the most important and powerful position of the Hungarian church: the Archbishopric of Esztergom. His predecessor Thomas died in the first half of 1321. Subsequently, the cathedral chapter of Esztergom convened and elected Bolesław sometime before 14 April, he was also styled as perpetual count of Esztergom County thereafter. Bolesław has not yet visited Avignon for papal confirmation, because Charles' eldest namesake son was born in that year and the archbishop-elect baptized him. Finally, Pope John XXII confirmed his election on 2 October 1321. Bolesław visited the papal court two months after his confirmation, in December, where he was consecrated as bishop by Berengar Fredol. In the name of the pope, cardinal Napoleone Orsini Frangipani sent his pallium on 5 December 1321. Simultaneously, Bolesław has been granted permission to dispose of ten persons from his diocese (natalis defectus) and to exempt ten persons from excommunication imposed for violence against church members, and to absolve subjects for 40 days on the days when he bears his pallium. Bolesław paid altogether 400 golden florins as part of his servitium commune to the papal court by the summer of 1322; at that time he still owed 300 florins from servitium commune and 100 florins from servitia minuta.

One of the greatest successes of Bolesław during his archiepiscopate was the normalization of the diplomatic relations between Hungary and Venice. In January 1322, two Dalmatian towns, Šibenik and Trogir, rebelled against Mladen Šubić, who was a son of Charles's one-time leading partisan, Paul Šubić. The two towns also accepted the suzerainty of the Republic of Venice although Charles had urged Venice not to intervene in the conflict between his subjects. These countries (who had a long-lasting dispute over the Adriatic coast), finally entered into an agreement after the Archbishop's mediation, who visited the republic in the spring of that year: the rich cities of Dalmatia (who included Zadar and Split) were placed under Hungarian rule. Bolesław also participated in the royal campaign against the last rebellious lords, the Šubići and Babonići in Croatia at the turn of 1322 and 1323. After their defeat, Charles had taken "full possession" of his kingdom, as one of his charters concluded. Charles I appointed Bolesław ispán of Požega County in 1323 for his successful diplomatic mission to Venice.

=== Ecclesiastical affairs ===
Bolesław successfully recovered some estates and landholdings, which had formerly belonged to the archdiocese. For instance, Charles has returned Rozsnyóbánya, Szelincs, Vága (present-day Rožňava, Zeleneč and Váhovce in Slovakia, respectively) and Türnye in 1323. However the recovery of Nezsider (today Neusiedl am See, Austria) was unsuccessful, despite even Pope John's intervention, as the donation letters were lost and Bolesław could not prove that the archdiocese was granted the land by King Andrew III's consort Queen Agnes. Bolesław personally visited the widow, who lived in the Königsfelden Monastery, in order to renew her donation, but he did not succeed. In addition to recover previously owned lands, Bolesław has increased the wealth of his archdiocese. He bought Csév, Esztergom County for inexpensive 50 silver denari from Mikóca Rosd, who, with that step, paid his debts, which existed since his act of unintentional homicide against a serf in Kesztölc, a subject of the archdiocese. He also exchanged the estate of Ölveld for Borch in 1327.

During the first six years of his rule as Archbishop (1321–1326), Bolesław had to fight against an extreme Franciscan faction, the Fraticelli, who at that time were considered too radical by Pope John XXII. He expelled the order from the territory of the Kingdom of Hungary, ahead of the Pope's orders. In the autumn of 1322, Pope John appointed Bolesław as patron (conservator) of the Order of Saint Paul the First Hermit, alongside Ladislaus Jánki, the Archbishop of Kalocsa and vice-chancellor Ladislaus, the provost of Székesfehérvár. Bolesław reconfirmed the privileges of the Poor Clares of Pressburg (present-day Bratislava, Slovakia) on 1 April 1324. When Pope John called the Hungarian Benedictine abbots to convene their collegiate annually in order to restore discipline, he simultaneously commissioned metropolitans Bolesław and Ladislaus Jánki to supervise the enforcement of the provision. Bolesław held a provincial synod in Esztergom on 8 November 1326. Though its edicts did not survive, a charter issued in Visegrád on 4 February 1327 summarizes the key elements. Accordingly, the synod was attended by the all suffragans, in addition to abbots, provosts and representants of cathedral chapters. There Henry, Bishop of Veszprém filed a lawsuit against Bolesław, accusing him of unauthorized possession of some churches and their benefices in his diocese. After that the archbishop recommended to appoint each two trustees to pursue the probation procedure. The synod ruled in favour of Henry. Bolesław tried to delay the implementation and moved the place of the council to Visegrád. The archbishop did not present before the council until 20 January 1327, when he requested papal mediation and proceeding.

Bolesław tried to maintain their jurisdiction over Spisz (Szepes), disputed by the Diocese of Kraków. Its bishop Nanker complained to the Holy See in 1324 that archbishops Thomas and his successor Bolesław have exercised unjustifiably ecclesiastical authority over the Catholic communities of Podolin, Gnézda and Lubló (present-day Podolínec, Hniezdne and Stará Ľubovňa in Slovakia, respectively). On 15 June 1324, Pope John XXII instructed Bartholomew, the superior of the Premonstratensian monastery of Czarnowąsy to investigate the case. By 1325, both Bolesław and Nanker selected their attorneys, along with John, provost of Szepes in April 1326. At first, representatives of Esztergom did not appear before the court, later the trial delayed because of the deaths of Bolesław and Bartholomew in 1328. This conflict was only resolved in 1332, when Bartholomew's successor Prot ruled in favour of Kraków, however the towns passed in the reign of Hungary in later in the second half of the 14th century, overwriting the verdict.

At the end of his life, Bolesław fought for the approval of the election of his youngest brother Mieszko as Bishop of Nyitra (Nitra). The local chapter was against the nepotism, according to the complaint of its lector Stephen. The clergyman reported on 1 May 1328 that immediately after the death of their bishop John, they sent a delegation to King Charles, but their envoys were captured en route and imprisoned in Esztergom Castle by Bolesław's troops. There the archbishop persuaded the delegates to accept his brother as their bishop. Supporting his claim, the archiepiscopal banderium seized the St. Emmeram's Cathedral and its collegiate chapter. His soldiers threatened the canons with death, if they do not accept Mieszko as bishop. The full support shown to the Piast princes by King Charles and Queen Elizabeth ended that dispute with a complete success to Mieszko.

Bolesław died in December 1328 and was buried in the cathedral in Esztergom. The Duchy of Toszek was then officially merged to Bytom by Duke Władysław.

== Sources ==
- Barcs, Eszter (2003). "Piast Boleszló [Boleslaus Piast]". In Beke, Margit (ed.). Esztergomi érsekek 1001–2003 [Archbishops of Esztergom 1001–2003] (in Hungarian). Szent István Társulat. pp. 151–156. ISBN 963-361-472-4.
- Engel, Pál (1996). Magyarország világi archontológiája, 1301–1457, I. [Secular Archontology of Hungary, 1301–1457, Volume I] (in Hungarian). História, MTA Történettudományi Intézete. ISBN 963-8312-44-0.
- Maléth, Ágnes (2020). A Magyar Királyság és a Szentszék kapcsolata I. Károly korában (1301–1342) [The Relationship of the Hungarian Kingdom and the Holy See in the time of Charles I (1301–1342)] (in Hungarian). Pécsi Tudományegyetem BTK TTI Középkori és Koraújkori Történeti Tanszék. ISBN 978-963-429-500-6.
- Sroka, Stanisław (1994). "Egy lengyel származású főpap a 14. századi Magyarországon. Boleszló esztergomi érsek (1321–1328) [A prelate of Polish origin in 14th century Hungary. Boleslo, Archbishop of Esztergom (1321–1328)]". Aetas. 9 (1). AETAS Könyv- és Lapkiadó Egyesület: 89–101.

Bolesław of Toszek House of Piast Born: c. 1278 Died: December 1328
Regnal titles
New creation	Duke of Toszek; 1303–1328	Succeeded by Władysław
Catholic Church titles
Preceded by Thomas	Archbishop of Esztergom; 1321–1328	Succeeded by Nicholas Dörögdi elected
