= Lea Ráskay =

Hungarian nun and writer

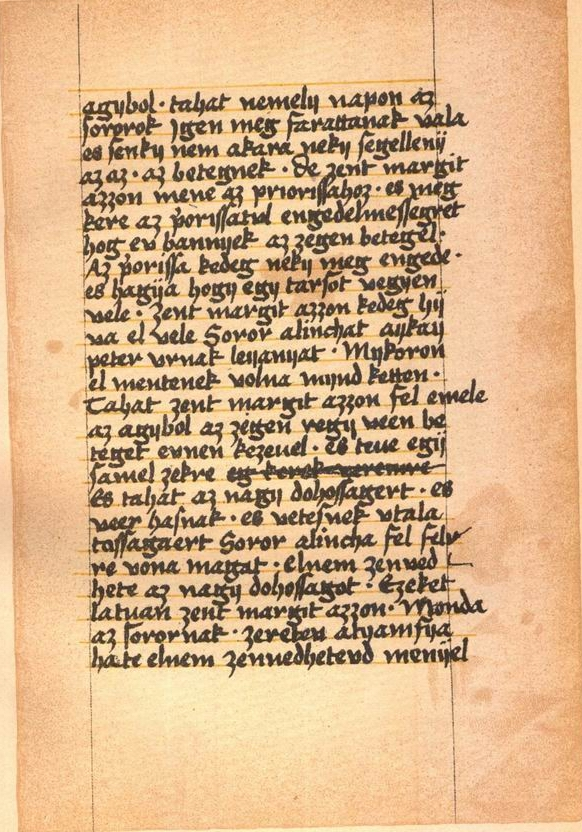
Ráskay's handwriting in the Legend of Saint Margaret, 1510

Lea Ráskay, O.P. (Hungarian pronunciation: [ˈlɛɒ ˈraːʃkɒi]; early 16th century, sometimes also spelled Ráskai) was a Hungarian nun and scholar of the 16th century.

== Life ==
Ráskay was likely a descendant of that old Hungarian aristocratic family which would have gotten its name after the village of Ráska, and until the end of the 16th century, held important positions in the courts of the Kings of Hungary.

Ráskay was a member of the Dominican monastery on Rabbit Island (today Margaret Island, Budapest), founded by King Bela IV of Hungary in 1252, to provide a closer home for their daughter, Margaret, later declared a saint, who had become a member of the Dominican Order. Ráskay was highly learned and well read, and is famous for copying and translating several Hungarian codices that without her work would not have survived. Among them the one for which she is best known: the Legend of Saint Margaret, about Saint Margaret of Hungary, who had lived in the same monastery nearly three hundred years before Ráskay.

She was assigned by the prioress of the monastery to copying manuscripts in its scriptorium, and was the librarian for the community, possibly between 1510 and 1527, according to her notes in specific codices. Ráskay also worked as a secretary, as a manuscript written in the name of Ilona Bocskay is known from her. With her collaborators, Ráskay was working on more books simultaneously. In 1529, when the monastery was evacuated because of the danger of the Ottoman forces, she fled, but took the most important codices to a safe place.

The place and date of her death are unknown.

== Works ==
All the below works were written in Hungarian.

- Legend of Saint Margaret (1510; copied from a lost codex of the 14th century)
- parts of the Codex Cornides (1514–1519
- Codex Domokos (1517)
- parts of the Jordánszky Codex (1519)
  - parts of the Old Testament
  - The Gospels
- Három körösztény leány (c. 1521–1530)
- Codex Horvát (1522)

== See also ==
- Legend of Saint Margaret
- Margaret Island
- Hungarian literature
