= Margaret of Hungary (saint) =

Hungarian princess and saint

Saint Margaret of Hungary O.P.
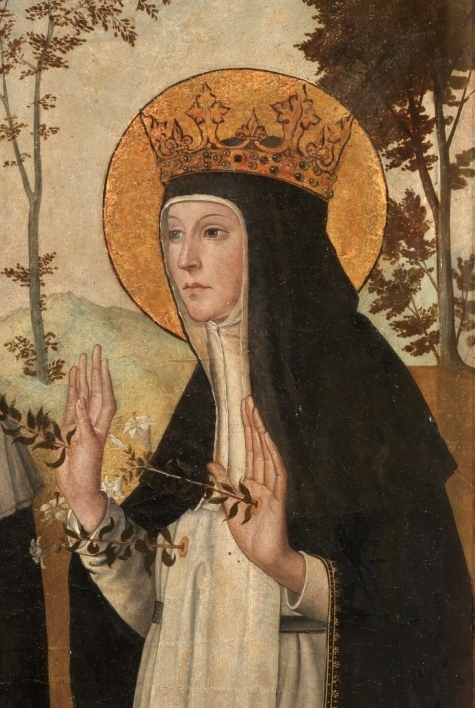

Nun and Virgin
- Born: 27 January 1242; Klis Fortress, Klis, Kingdom of Croatia
- Died: 18 January 1270 (aged 27); Nyulak Szigete, Kingdom of Hungary
- Venerated in: Roman Catholic Church (Dominican Order)
- Beatified: 28 July 1789, Saint Peter's Basilica, Papal States by Pope Pius VI
- Canonized: 19 November 1943, Saint Peter's Basilica, Vatican City by Pope Pius XII
- Feast: 18 January
- Attributes: A lily and a book
- Patronage: Budapest

Margaret of Hungary, OP (Margit in Hungarian; 27 January 1242 – 18 January 1270) was a Dominican nun and the daughter of King Béla IV of Hungary and Maria Laskarina. She was the younger sister of Kinga of Poland (Kunegunda) and Yolanda of Poland and, through her father, the niece of the famed Elizabeth of Hungary. She also had an older sister with the same name, who died before she was born.

== Life ==
Margaret was born in Klis Fortress in the Kingdom of Croatia, the eighth and last daughter (9th of 10 children) of the royal couple. They resided there during the first Mongol invasion of Hungary as her father was also ruler of this land. Her parents vowed that if Hungary was liberated from the Mongols, they would dedicate the child to religion.

The three-year-old Margaret was entrusted by her parents to the Dominican monastery at Veszprém in 1245. Six years later she was transferred to the Monastery of the Blessed Virgin founded by her parents on Nyulak Szigete (Rabbit Island) near Buda (today Margaret Island, named after her, and a part of Budapest; the ruins of the monastery can still be seen). She spent the rest of her life there, dedicating herself to religion and opposing all attempts of her father to arrange a political marriage for her with King Ottokar II of Bohemia.

She appears to have taken solemn vows when she was eighteen years old. In marked contrast to the customs of her Order, she received the Consecration of Virgins along with some other royals to prevent further attempts on the part of her father to have her vows dispensed by the pope for marriage.

Many of the details of her life are known from the Legend of Saint Margaret, written probably in the 14th century and translated from Latin to Hungarian in the 15th. The only remaining copy of the legend is in the Margaret Codex copied by the Dominican nun Lea Ráskay around 1510. According to the legend, Margaret chastised herself from early childhood, wore an iron girdle, hairshirts and shoes spiked with nails and performed the most menial work in the convent. The extravagance of the penances she undertook may have shortened her life. She died on 18 January 1270.

== Veneration ==
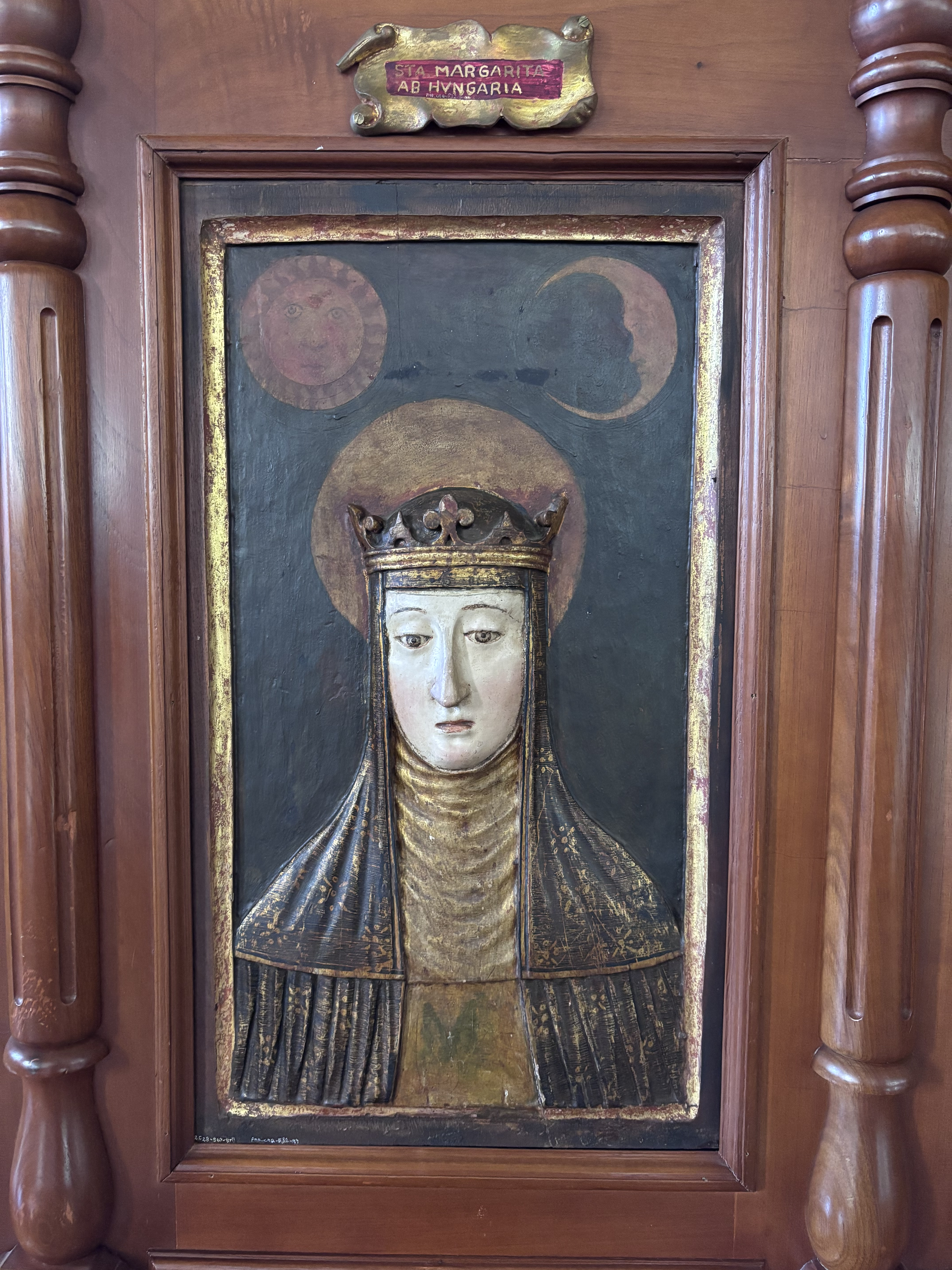
Margaret of Hungary, by Diego de Robles (c. 16th century). Santo Domingo Convent, Quito.

She was venerated as a saint soon after her death, e.g., a church dedicated to her in Bocfolde, Zala County, appears in documents dated 1426. Steps were taken to procure her canonization shortly after her death, at the request of her brother King Stephen V. The necessary investigations were taken up between 1270 and 1276, but the canonization process was not successful, even though 74 miracles were ascribed to her intercession, most of them referring to curing illnesses, even someone coming back from the dead. Among those giving testimony were 27 people for whom miracles had been wrought. Unsuccessful attempts to canonize her were also made in 1640 and 1770. She was finally canonized by Pope Pius XII on 19 November 1943, at that time the feast day of her aunt, Saint Elizabeth of Hungary.

Her feast day is celebrated by the Dominican Order. Raised by Pope Pius VII to a festum duplex, it is the day of her death, 18 January.

Her monastery was among those suppressed in 1782, part of the suppression of all monastic orders by the Emperor Joseph II. At that time, her remains were given to the Poor Clares. They were kept in Pozsony (today Bratislava) and Buda. The relics were partly destroyed in 1789 but some portions were preserved and are now kept in Esztergom, Győr, and Pannonhalma.

In art Margaret is usually depicted in a Dominican nun's religious habit, holding a white lily and a book.

The Latin-English edition of her Life, legend and canonization documents: Legenda vetus, acta processus canonizationis et miracula sanctae Margaritae de Hungaria / The oldest legend, acts of the canonization process, and miracles of Saint Margaret of Hungary. eds.Ildikó Csepregi, Gábor Klaniczay, Bence Péterfi, C Clifford Flanigan, Louis Perraud, Budapest: CEU Press, 2018

== Ancestry ==
Ancestors of Margaret of Hungary (saint)

16. Géza II of Hungary
8. Béla III of Hungary
17. Euphrosyne of Kiev
4. Andrew II of Hungary
18. Raynald of Châtillon
9. Agnes of Antioch
19. Constance of Antioch
2. Béla IV of Hungary
20. Berthold III of Andechs
10. Berthold IV, Duke of Merania
21. Hedwig of Wittelsbach
5. Gertrude of Merania
22. Dedo V, Count of Wettin
11.Agnes of Wettin and Rochlitz
23. Matilda of Heinsberg
1. Saint Margaret of Hungary
24. ?
12. Manuel Laskaris
25. ?
6. Theodore I Laskaris
26. ?
13. Ioanna Karatzaina
27. ?
3. Maria Laskarina
28. Andronicos Dukas Angelos
14. Byzantine Emperor Alexios III Angelos
29. Euphrosyne Castamonitissa
7. Anna Komnena Angelina
30. Andronikos Doukas Kamateros
15. Euphrosyne Doukaina Kamatera
31. ?

== See also ==
- Saint Margaret of Hungary, patron saint archive
- Isten, hazánkért térdelünk
