= Isten =

Isten may refer to:

== Mythology ==
- Istanu, a god in Anatolian mythology
- Isten, an alternative spelling of Astennu, a figure in Egyptian mythology
- Isten (Hungarian pronunciation: [ˈiʃtɛn]) is the word for God in the Hungarian language

== Others ==
- Isten, áldd meg a magyart (God, bless the Hungarians), the opening line of Himnusz, the national anthem of Hungary
- Isten, hazánkért térdelünk (God, We Kneel for our Country), a Hungarian anthem and anthology of Hungarian saints.
- Isten hozta, őrnagy úr! (The Toth Family), a 1969 Hungarian comedy-drama film directed by Zoltán Fábri
- Istensegíts (Ţibeni), a village within the commune of Satu Mare in Suceava County, Romania
- Istentó, a village within the commune of Band in Mureș County, Romania
