= January 28 =

January 28 this year in various calendars
- Wednesday, 28 January 2026
Akan	Monowukuo
Armenian	12 Mehekani 1475
Aztec	Toxcatl 18, 6 Miquiztli
Babylonian	8 Tebetu, 2336 SE
Balinese pawukon	Luang, Pepet, Kajeng, Laba, Keliwon, Maulu, Buda of Matal, Brahma, Erangan, Manuh
Bengali	14 Magh, BS 1432
Chinese	Yang Water Tiger・Three Stars Mansion; Wood Snake Year, Month 12, Day 10 (Dahan, 7 days until Lichun)
Common Era	28 January 2026 CE
Coptic	20 Tobi, AM 1742
Egyptian	17 Payni, 2774 NE
Ethiopian	20 Ṭer, 2018 Amätä Məhrät
French Republican	Décade I, Nonidi de Pluviôse de l'Année 234 de la République
Gregorian	28 January, AD 2026
Hebrew	10 Shevat, AM 5786
Hindu	Kṛttikā・Śukla; Solar: 15 Māgha, 1947 SE; Lunisolar: Daśamī, Śukla pakṣa of Māgha, 2082 VE; Siddhārthin・5126 KY・1,872,603
Icelandic	Miðvikudagur, 6 Þorri 2025
Islamic	9 Sha'aban, AH 1447 (using tabular method)
ISO week date	2026-W05-3
Japanese	10 Shiwasu, Reiwa 8 (Daikan, 7 days until Risshun)
Julian	15 January, AD 2026 (AM 7534)
Julian day	2461069
Korean	10 Sodal, 4358 DE
Maya	13.0.13.5.6; 4 Pax, 6 Cimi
Roman	ante diem XVIII Kalendas Februarias, MMDCCLXXIX AUC
Solar Hijri	8 Bahman, SH 1404
Tibetan	10 rgyal, shing mo sbrul 2152 or 1771 or 999

<<	January					>>
Su	Mo	Tu	We	Th	Fr	Sa
				1	2	3
4	5	6	7	8	9	10
11	12	13	14	15	16	17
18	19	20	21	22	23	24
25	26	27	28	29	30	31
2026

January 28 in recent years
2026 (Wednesday)
2025 (Tuesday)
2024 (Sunday)
2023 (Saturday)
2022 (Friday)
2021 (Thursday)
2020 (Tuesday)
2019 (Monday)
2018 (Sunday)
2017 (Saturday)

January 28 is the 28th day of the year in the Gregorian calendar; 337 days remain until the end of the year (338 in leap years).

== Events ==
=== Pre-1600 ===
- 98 – On the death of Nerva, Trajan is declared Roman emperor in Cologne, the seat of his government in lower Germany.
- 814 – The death of Charlemagne, the first Holy Roman Emperor, brings about the accession of his son Louis the Pious as ruler of the Frankish Empire.
- 1069 – Robert de Comines, appointed Earl of Northumbria by William the Conqueror, rides into Durham, England, where he is defeated and killed by rebels. This incident leads to the Harrying of the North.
- 1077 – Walk to Canossa: The excommunication of Henry IV, Holy Roman Emperor, is lifted after he humbles himself before Pope Gregory VII at Canossa in Italy.
- 1393 – King Charles VI of France is nearly killed when several other dancers' costumes catch fire during a masquerade ball in Paris.
- 1521 – The Diet of Worms begins, lasting until May 25.
- 1547 – Edward VI, the nine-year-old son of Henry VIII, becomes King of England on his father's death.
- 1568 – The Edict of Torda prohibits the persecution of individuals on religious grounds in John Sigismund Zápolya's Eastern Hungarian Kingdom.
- 1573 – Articles of the Warsaw Confederation are signed, sanctioning freedom of religion in Poland.
- 1591 – Execution of Agnes Sampson, accused of witchcraft in Edinburgh.

=== 1601–1900 ===
- 1624 – Sir Thomas Warner founds the first British colony in the Caribbean, on the island of Saint Kitts.
- 1671 – Original city of Panama (founded in 1519) is destroyed by a fire when privateer Henry Morgan sacks and sets fire to it. The site of the previously devastated city is still in ruins (see Panama Viejo).
- 1724 – The Russian Academy of Sciences is founded in St. Petersburg, Russia, by Peter the Great, and implemented by Senate decree. It is called the St. Petersburg Academy of Sciences until 1917.
- 1754 – Sir Horace Walpole coins the word serendipity in a letter to a friend.
- 1813 – Jane Austen's Pride and Prejudice is first published in the United Kingdom.
- 1846 – The Battle of Aliwal, India, is won by British troops commanded by Sir Harry Smith.
- 1851 – Northwestern University becomes the first chartered university in Illinois.
- 1855 – A locomotive on the Panama Canal Railway runs from the Atlantic Ocean to the Pacific Ocean for the first time.
- 1871 – Franco-Prussian War: The Siege of Paris ends in French defeat and an armistice.
- 1878 – Yale Daily News becomes the first independent daily college newspaper in the United States.
- 1896 – Walter Arnold of East Peckham, Kent, becomes the first person to be convicted of speeding. He was fined one shilling, plus costs, for speeding at 8 mph (13 km/h), thereby exceeding the contemporary speed limit of 2 mph (3.2 km/h).

=== 1901–present ===
- 1902 – The Carnegie Institution of Washington is founded in Washington, D.C., with a $10 million gift from Andrew Carnegie.
- 1908 – Members of the Portuguese Republican Party fail in their attempted coup d'état against the administrative dictatorship of Prime Minister João Franco.
- 1909 – United States troops leave Cuba, with the exception of Guantanamo Bay Naval Base, after being there since the Spanish–American War.
- 1915 – An act of the U.S. Congress creates the United States Coast Guard as a branch of the United States Armed Forces.
- 1916 – The Canadian province of Manitoba grants women the right to vote and run for office in provincial elections (although still excluding women of Indigenous or Asian heritage), marking the first time women in Canada are granted voting rights.
- 1918 – Finnish Civil War: The Red Guard rebels seize control of the capital, Helsinki; members of the Senate of Finland go underground.
- 1919 – The Order of the White Rose of Finland is established by Baron Gustaf Mannerheim, the regent of Finland.
- 1920 – Foundation of the Spanish Legion.
- 1922 – Knickerbocker Storm: Washington, D.C.'s biggest snowfall, causes a disaster when the roof of the Knickerbocker Theatre collapses, killing over 100 people.
- 1932 – Japanese forces attack Shanghai.
- 1933 – The name Pakistan is coined by Choudhry Rahmat Ali Khan and is accepted by Indian Muslims who then thereby adopted it further for the Pakistan Movement seeking independence.
- 1935 – Iceland becomes the first Western country to legalize therapeutic abortion.
- 1938 – The World Land Speed Record on a public road is broken by Rudolf Caracciola in the Mercedes-Benz W125 Rekordwagen at a speed of 432.7 kilometres per hour (268.9 mph).
- 1941 – Franco-Thai War: Final air battle of the conflict. A Japanese-mediated armistice goes into effect later in the day.
- 1945 – World War II: Supplies begin to reach the Republic of China over the newly reopened Burma Road.
- 1956 – Elvis Presley makes his first national television appearance.
- 1958 – The Lego company patents the design of its Lego bricks, still compatible with bricks produced today.
- 1960 – The National Football League announces expansion teams for Dallas to start in the 1960 NFL season and Minneapolis-St. Paul for the 1961 NFL season.
- 1964 – An unarmed United States Air Force T-39 Sabreliner on a training mission is shot down over Erfurt, East Germany, by a Soviet MiG-19.
- 1965 – The current design of the Flag of Canada is chosen by an act of Parliament.
- 1977 – The first day of the Great Lakes Blizzard of 1977, which dumps 3 metres (10 ft) of snow in one day in Upstate New York. Buffalo, Syracuse, Watertown, and surrounding areas are most affected.
- 1977 – The Shining, the horror novel and the first hardcover bestseller by Stephen King, is published.
- 1980 – USCGC Blackthorn collides with the tanker Capricorn while leaving Tampa, Florida and capsizes, killing 23 Coast Guard crewmembers.
- 1981 – Ronald Reagan lifts remaining domestic petroleum price and allocation controls in the United States, helping to end the 1979 energy crisis and begin the 1980s oil glut.
- 1982 – US Army General James L. Dozier is rescued by Italian anti-terrorism forces from captivity by the Red Brigades.
- 1984 – Tropical Storm Domoina makes landfall in southern Mozambique, eventually causing 214 deaths and some of the most severe flooding so far recorded in the region.
- 1985 – Supergroup USA for Africa (United Support of Artists for Africa) records the hit single We Are the World, to help raise funds for Ethiopian famine relief.
- 1986 – Space Shuttle program: STS-51-L mission: Space Shuttle Challenger disintegrates after liftoff, killing all seven astronauts on board.
- 1988 – In R v Morgentaler the Supreme Court of Canada strikes down all anti-abortion laws.
- 2002 – TAME Flight 120, a Boeing 727-100, crashes in the Andes mountains in southern Colombia, killing 94.
- 2006 – The roof of one of the buildings at the Katowice International Fair in Poland collapses due to the weight of snow, killing 65 and injuring more than 170 others.
- 2021 – A nitrogen leak at a poultry food processing facility in Gainesville, Georgia kills six and injures at least ten.
- 2023 – Protests begin in the United States after police beat and kill Tyre Nichols.
- 2026 – A Learjet 45 crashes on approach to Baramati Airport in Maharashtra, killing all six occupants including the Deputy Chief Minister of Maharashtra, Ajit Pawar.
- 2026 – The Rubaya mine collapse at Rubaya mines in DR Congo causes at least 400 deaths and injured several others.
- 2026 – Storm Kristin causes a catastrophic impact in Portugal and Spain with €6 billion in damage in the central region of Portugal, 15 deaths and 2,000 injuries.

== Births ==
=== Pre-1600 ===
- 598 – Taizong, emperor of the Tang dynasty (died 649)
- 1312 – Joan II, queen of Navarre (died 1349)
- 1368 – Razadarit, king of Hanthawaddy (died 1421)
- 1457 – Henry VII, king of England (died 1509)
- 1533 – Paul Luther, German scientist (died 1593)
- 1540 – Ludolph van Ceulen, German-Dutch mathematician and academic (died 1610)
- 1582 – John Barclay, French-Scottish poet and author (died 1621)
- 1600 – Clement IX, pope of the Catholic Church (died 1669)

=== 1601–1900 ===
- 1608 – Giovanni Alfonso Borelli, Italian physiologist and physicist (died 1679)
- 1611 – Johannes Hevelius, Polish astronomer and politician (died 1687)
- 1622 – Adrien Auzout, French astronomer and instrument maker (died 1691)
- 1693 – Gregor Werner, Austrian composer (died 1766)
- 1701 – Charles Marie de La Condamine, French mathematician and geographer (died 1774)
- 1706 – John Baskerville, English printer and typographer (died 1775)
- 1712 – Tokugawa Ieshige, Japanese shōgun (died 1761)
- 1717 – Mustafa III, Ottoman sultan (died 1774)
- 1726 – Christian Felix Weiße, German poet and playwright (died 1802)
- 1755 – Samuel Thomas von Sömmerring, Polish-German physician, anthropologist, and paleontologist (died 1830)
- 1784 – George Hamilton-Gordon, 4th Earl of Aberdeen, Scottish politician, Prime Minister of the United Kingdom (died 1860)
- 1797 – Charles Gray Round, English lawyer and politician (died 1867)
- 1818 – George S. Boutwell, American lawyer and politician, 28th United States Secretary of the Treasury (died 1905)
- 1822 – Alexander Mackenzie, Scottish-Canadian politician, 2nd Prime Minister of Canada (died 1892)
- 1833 – Charles George Gordon, English general and politician (died 1885)
- 1853 – José Martí, Cuban journalist, poet, and theorist (died 1895)
- 1853 – Vladimir Solovyov, Russian philosopher, poet, and critic (died 1900)
- 1855 – William Seward Burroughs I, American businessman, founded the Burroughs Corporation (died 1898)
- 1858 – Tannatt William Edgeworth David, Welsh-Australian geologist and explorer (died 1934)
- 1861 – Julián Felipe, Filipino composer and educator (died 1944)
- 1863 – Ernest William Christmas, Australian-American painter (died 1918)
- 1864 – Charles W. Nash, American businessman, founded Nash Motors (died 1948)
- 1865 – Lala Lajpat Rai, Indian author and politician (died 1928)
- 1865 – Kaarlo Juho Ståhlberg, Finnish lawyer, judge, and politician, 1st President of Finland (died 1952)
- 1873 – Colette, French novelist and journalist (died 1954)
- 1873 – Monty Noble, Australian cricketer (died 1940)
- 1874 – Alex Smith, Scottish golfer (died 1930)
- 1875 – Julián Carrillo, Mexican violinist, composer, and conductor (died 1965)
- 1878 – Walter Kollo, German composer and conductor (died 1940)
- 1880 – Bert Strudwick, English cricketer and coach (died 1970)
- 1884 – Auguste Piccard, Swiss physicist and explorer (died 1962)
- 1885 – Vahan Terian, Armenian poet and activist (died 1920)
- 1886 – Marthe Bibesco, Romanian-French author and poet (died 1973)
- 1886 – Hidetsugu Yagi, Japanese engineer and academic (died 1976)
- 1887 – Arthur Rubinstein, Polish-American pianist and educator (died 1982)
- 1897 – Valentin Kataev, Russian author and playwright (died 1986)
- 1900 – Alice Neel, American painter (died 1984)

=== 1901–present ===
- 1903 – Aleksander Kamiński, Polish author and educator (died 1978)
- 1903 – Kathleen Lonsdale, Irish crystallographer and 1st female FRS (died 1971)
- 1906 – Pat O'Callaghan, Irish hammer thrower (died 1991)
- 1906 – Markos Vafeiadis, Greek general and politician (died 1992)
- 1908 – Paul Misraki, Turkish-French composer and historian (died 1998)
- 1909 – John Thomson, Scottish footballer (died 1931)
- 1910 – John Banner, Austrian actor (died 1973)
- 1911 – Johan van Hulst, Dutch politician, academic and author, Yad Vashem recipient (died 2018)
- 1912 – Jackson Pollock, American painter (died 1956)
- 1918 – Harry Corbett, English puppeteer, actor, and screenwriter (died 1989)
- 1918 – Trevor Skeet, New Zealand-English lawyer and politician (died 2004)
- 1919 – Gabby Gabreski, American colonel and pilot (died 2002)
- 1920 – Lewis Wilson, American actor (died 2000)
- 1921 – Vytautas Norkus, Lithuanian–American basketball player (died 2014)
- 1922 – Anna Gordy Gaye, American songwriter and producer, co-founded Anna Records (died 2014)
- 1922 – Robert W. Holley, American biochemist and academic, Nobel Prize laureate (died 1993)
- 1924 – Marcel Broodthaers, Belgian painter and poet (died 1976)
- 1925 – Raja Ramanna, Indian physicist and politician (died 2004)
- 1926 – Jimmy Bryan, American race car driver (died 1960)
- 1927 – Per Oscarsson, Swedish actor, director, producer, and screenwriter (died 2010)
- 1927 – Ronnie Scott, English saxophonist (died 1996)
- 1927 – Hiroshi Teshigahara, Japanese director, producer, and screenwriter (died 2001)
- 1927 – Vera Williams, American author and illustrator (died 2015)
- 1929 – Acker Bilk, English singer and clarinet player (died 2014)
- 1929 – Edith M. Flanigen, American chemist (died 2026)
- 1929 – Nikolai Parshin, Russian footballer and manager (died 2012)
- 1929 – Claes Oldenburg, Swedish-American sculptor and illustrator (died 2022)
- 1930 – Kurt Biedenkopf, German academic and politician, 54th President of the German Bundesrat (died 2021)
- 1930 – Roy Clarke, English screenwriter, comedian and soldier
- 1933 – Jack Hill, American director and screenwriter
- 1934 – Juan Manuel Bordeu, Argentinian race car driver (died 1990)
- 1935 – Helga Kleiner, German politician
- 1935 – David Lodge, English author and critic (died 2025)
- 1935 – Nicholas Pryor, American actor (died 2024)
- 1936 – Alan Alda, American actor, director, and writer
- 1936 – Ismail Kadare, Albanian novelist, poet, essayist, and playwright (died 2024)
- 1937 – Karel Čáslavský, Czech historian and television host (died 2013)
- 1937 – John Normington, English actor (died 2007)
- 1938 – Tomas Lindahl, Swedish-English biologist and academic, Nobel Prize laureate
- 1938 – Leonid Zhabotinsky, Ukrainian weightlifter and coach (died 2016)
- 1939 – John M. Fabian, American colonel, pilot, and astronaut
- 1940 – Carlos Slim, Mexican businessman and philanthropist, founded Grupo Carso
- 1941 – Joel Crothers, American actor (died 1985)
- 1942 – Sjoukje Dijkstra, Dutch figure skater (died 2024)
- 1942 – Erkki Pohjanheimo, Finnish director and producer
- 1943 – Paul Henderson, Canadian ice hockey player and author
- 1943 – Dick Taylor, English guitarist and songwriter
- 1944 – Susan Howard, American actress and writer
- 1944 – Rosalía Mera, Spanish businesswoman, co-founded Inditex and Zara (died 2013)
- 1944 – John Tavener, English composer (died 2013)
- 1945 – Marthe Keller, Swiss actress and director
- 1947 – Jeanne Shaheen, American educator and politician, 78th Governor of New Hampshire
- 1948 – Ilkka Kanerva, Finnish politician (died 2022)
- 1948 – Bob Moses, American drummer
- 1948 – Charles Taylor, Liberian politician, 22nd President of Liberia
- 1949 – Mike Moore, New Zealand union leader and politician, 34th Prime Minister of New Zealand (died 2020)
- 1949 – Gregg Popovich, American basketball player and coach
- 1949 – Jim Wong-Chu, Canadian poet (died 2017)
- 1950 – Barbi Benton, American actress, singer and model
- 1950 – Hamad bin Isa Al Khalifa, Bahraini king
- 1950 – David C. Hilmers, American colonel, physician, and astronaut
- 1950 – Naila Kabeer, Bangladeshi-English economist and academic
- 1951 – Brian Bilbray, American politician
- 1951 – Leonid Kadeniuk, Ukrainian general, pilot, and astronaut (died 2018)
- 1951 – Billy Bass Nelson, American R&B/funk bass player (died 2026)
- 1952 – Richard Glatzer, American director, producer, and screenwriter (died 2015)
- 1953 – Colin Campbell, Canadian ice hockey player and coach
- 1954 – Peter Lampe, German theologian and historian
- 1954 – Bruno Metsu, French footballer and manager (died 2013)
- 1954 – Rick Warren, American pastor and author
- 1955 – Vinod Khosla, Indian-American businessman, co-founded Sun Microsystems
- 1955 – Nicolas Sarkozy, French lawyer and politician, 23rd President of France
- 1956 – Ruth Becher, Austrian politician
- 1956 – Richard Danielpour, American composer and educator
- 1956 – Peter Schilling, German singer-songwriter
- 1957 – Mark Napier, Canadian ice hockey player and sportscaster
- 1957 – Nick Price, Zimbabwean-South African golfer
- 1957 – Frank Skinner, English comedian, actor, and author
- 1958 – Stan Smyl, Canadian ice hockey player and executive
- 1959 – Frank Darabont, American director and producer
- 1960 – Loren Legarda, Filipino journalist and politician
- 1961 – Mike Holoway, British musician and actor
- 1961 – Normand Rochefort, Canadian ice hockey player and coach
- 1962 – Michael Cage, American basketball player and broadcaster
- 1962 – Keith Hamilton Cobb, American actor
- 1962 – Sam Phillips, American singer-songwriter and guitarist
- 1963 – Dan Spitz, American musician and songwriter
- 1964 – David Lawrence, English cricketer (died 2025)
- 1966 – Seiji Mizushima, Japanese director and producer
- 1966 – Michal Pivoňka, Czech ice hockey player
- 1967 – Billy Brownless, Australian footballer and sportscaster
- 1968 – Sarah McLachlan, Canadian singer-songwriter, pianist, and producer
- 1968 – DJ Muggs, American DJ and producer
- 1968 – Rakim, American rapper
- 1969 – Giorgio Lamberti, Italian swimmer
- 1969 – Kathryn Morris, American actress
- 1969 – Mo Rocca, American comedian and television journalist
- 1969 – Linda Sánchez, American lawyer and politician
- 1971 – Anthony Hamilton, American singer-songwriter and producer
- 1972 – Elena Baranova, Russian basketball player
- 1972 – Amy Coney Barrett, American jurist, academic, attorney, and Associate Justice of the Supreme Court of the United States
- 1972 – Mark Regan, English rugby player
- 1972 – Nicky Southall, English footballer and manager
- 1972 – Léon van Bon, Dutch cyclist
- 1972 – Gillian Vigman, American actress and comedian
- 1974 – Tony Delk, American basketball player and coach
- 1974 – Jermaine Dye, American baseball player
- 1974 – Ramsey Nasr, Dutch author and poet
- 1974 – Magglio Ordóñez, Venezuelan baseball player and politician
- 1975 – Pedro Pinto, Portuguese-American journalist
- 1975 – Junior Spivey, American baseball player and coach
- 1976 – Sireli Bobo, Fijian rugby player
- 1976 – Mark Madsen, American basketball player and coach
- 1976 – Rick Ross, American rapper and producer
- 1976 – Miltiadis Sapanis, Greek footballer
- 1977 – Sandis Buškevics, Latvian basketball player and coach
- 1977 – Daunte Culpepper, American football player
- 1977 – Joey Fatone, American singer, dancer, and television personality
- 1977 – Takuma Sato, Japanese race car driver
- 1978 – Gianluigi Buffon, Italian footballer
- 1978 – Jamie Carragher, English footballer and sportscaster
- 1978 – Papa Bouba Diop, Senegalese footballer (died 2020)
- 1978 – Big Freedia, American musician
- 1978 – Sheamus, Irish wrestler
- 1979 – Angelique Cabral, American actress
- 1980 – Nick Carter, American singer-songwriter and actor
- 1980 – Yasuhito Endō, Japanese footballer
- 1980 – Brian Fallon, American singer-songwriter
- 1980 – Michael Hastings, American journalist and author (died 2013)
- 1981 – Elijah Wood, American actor and producer
- 1982 – Chad Aull, American politician
- 1982 – Omar Cook, American-Montenegrin basketball player and coach
- 1984 – Ben Clucas, English race car driver
- 1984 – Stephen Gostkowski, American football player
- 1984 – Andre Iguodala, American basketball player
- 1984 – Anne Panter, English field hockey player
- 1985 – Daniel Carcillo, Canadian ice hockey player
- 1985 – J. Cole, American rapper
- 1985 – Lauris Dārziņš, Latvian ice hockey player
- 1985 – Tom Hopper, English actor
- 1985 – Arnold Mvuemba, French footballer
- 1985 – Libby Trickett, Australian swimmer
- 1986 – Jessica Ennis-Hill, English heptathlete and hurdler
- 1986 – Nathan Outteridge, Australian sailor
- 1986 – Asad Shafiq, Pakistani cricketer
- 1988 – Paul Henry, English footballer
- 1988 – Alexandra Krosney, American actress
- 1988 – Sanada, Japanese wrestler
- 1989 – Siem de Jong, Dutch footballer
- 1991 – Carl Klingberg, Swedish ice hockey player
- 1991 – Calum Worthy, Canadian actor
- 1992 – Sergio Araujo, Argentinian footballer
- 1993 – Will Poulter, English actor
- 1993 – Alan Williams, American basketball player
- 1994 – Joel Bolomboy, Russian-American basketball player
- 1994 – Lin Zhu, Chinese tennis player
- 1994 – Maluma, Colombian singer-songwriter, rapper, and actor
- 1995 – Mimi-Isabella Cesar, British rhythmic gymnast
- 1998 – Payton Pritchard, American basketball player
- 1998 – Ariel Winter, American actress
- 2000 – Abel Ruiz, Spanish footballer
- 2000 – Dušan Vlahović, Serbian footballer
- 2002 – Tabyana Ali, American actress and author
- 2002 – Yoo Seon-ho, South Korean actor
- 2003 – Whitney Peak, Ugandan-Canadian actress
- 2003 – Carson Hocevar, American professional stock car racing driver
- 2004 – Emoni Bates, American basketball player
- 2004 – Liam Öhgren, Swedish ice hockey player
- 2006 – Beckett Sennecke, Canadian ice hockey player
- 2007 – That Girl Lay Lay, American rapper

== Deaths ==
=== Pre-1600 ===
- 724 – Yazid II, Umayyad caliph (born 687)
- 814 – Charlemagne, Holy Roman emperor (born 742)
- 919 – Zhou Dewei, Chinese general
- 929 – Gao Jixing, founder of Chinese Jingnan (born 858)
- 947 – Jing Yanguang, Chinese general (born 892)
- 1061 – Spytihněv II, Duke of Bohemia (born 1031)
- 1142 – Yue Fei, Chinese general (born 1103)
- 1256 – William II, Count of Holland, King of Germany (born 1227)
- 1271 – Isabella of Aragon, Queen of France (born 1247)
- 1290 – Dervorguilla of Galloway, Scottish noble, mother of king John Balliol of Scotland (born c. 1210)
- 1443 – Robert le Maçon, French diplomat (born 1365)
- 1501 – John Dynham, 1st Baron Dynham, English baron and Lord High Treasurer (born 1433)
- 1547 – Henry VIII, king of England (born 1491)

=== 1601–1900 ===
- 1613 – Thomas Bodley, English diplomat and scholar, founded the Bodleian Library (born 1545)
- 1621 – Pope Paul V (born 1550)
- 1666 – Tommaso Dingli, Maltese architect and sculptor (born 1591)
- 1672 – Pierre Séguier, French politician, Lord Chancellor of France (born 1588)
- 1681 – Richard Allestree, English priest and academic (born 1619)
- 1687 – Johannes Hevelius, Polish astronomer and politician (born 1611)
- 1688 – Ferdinand Verbiest, Flemish Jesuit missionary in China (born 1623)
- 1697 – Sir John Fenwick, 3rd Baronet, English general and politician (born 1645)
- 1754 – Ludvig Holberg, Norwegian-Danish historian and philosopher (born 1684)
- 1782 – Jean Baptiste Bourguignon d'Anville, French geographer and cartographer (born 1697)
- 1832 – Augustin Daniel Belliard, French general (born 1769)
- 1859 – F. J. Robinson, 1st Viscount Goderich, English politician, Prime Minister of the United Kingdom (born 1782)
- 1864 – Émile Clapeyron, French physicist and engineer (born 1799)
- 1873 – John Hart, English-Australian politician, 10th Premier of South Australia (born 1809)

=== 1901–present ===
- 1903 – Augusta Holmès, French pianist and composer (born 1847)
- 1912 – Gustave de Molinari, Belgian economist and theorist (born 1819).
- 1912 – Eloy Alfaro, former president of Ecuador (born 1842)
- 1918 – John McCrae, Canadian soldier, physician, and author (born 1872)
- 1921 – Mustafa Suphi, Turkish journalist and politician (born 1883)
- 1930 – Emmy Destinn, Czech soprano and poet (born 1878)
- 1935 – Mikhail Ippolitov-Ivanov, Russian composer and conductor (born 1859)
- 1937 – Anastasios Metaxas, Greek architect and target shooter (born 1862)
- 1938 – Bernd Rosemeyer, German race car driver (born 1909)
- 1939 – W. B. Yeats, Irish poet and playwright, Nobel Prize laureate (born 1865)
- 1942 – Edward Siegler, American gymnast and triathlete (born 1881)
- 1945 – Roza Shanina, Russian sergeant and sniper (born 1924)
- 1947 – Reynaldo Hahn, Venezuelan-French composer, conductor, and critic (born 1875)
- 1948 – Hans Aumeier, German SS officer (born 1906)
- 1949 – Jean-Pierre Wimille, French race car driver (born 1908)
- 1950 – Nikolai Luzin, Russian mathematician and academic (born 1883)
- 1953 – James Scullin, Australian journalist and politician, 9th Prime Minister of Australia (born 1876)
- 1953 – Neyzen Tevfik, Turkish philosopher and poet (born 1879)
- 1959 – Walter Beall, American baseball player (born 1899)
- 1960 – Zora Neale Hurston, American novelist, short story writer, and folklorist (born 1891)
- 1963 – Gustave Garrigou, French cyclist (born 1884)
- 1965 – Tich Freeman, English cricketer (born 1888)
- 1965 – Maxime Weygand, Belgian-French general (born 1867)
- 1971 – Donald Winnicott, English paediatrician and psychoanalyst (born 1896)
- 1973 – John Banner, Austrian actor (born 1910)
- 1976 – Marcel Broodthaers, Belgian painter and poet (born 1924)
- 1978 – Ward Moore, American author (born 1903)
- 1983 – Billy Fury. English pop star (born 1940)
- 1983 – Frank Forde, Australian educator and politician, 15th Prime Minister of Australia (born 1890)
- 1986 – Space Shuttle Challenger crew
  - Gregory Jarvis, American captain, engineer, and astronaut (born 1944)
  - Christa McAuliffe, American educator and astronaut (born 1948)
  - Ronald McNair, American physicist and astronaut (born 1950)
  - Ellison Onizuka, American engineer and astronaut (born 1946)
  - Judith Resnik, American colonel, engineer, and astronaut (born 1949)
  - Dick Scobee, American colonel, pilot, and astronaut (born 1939)
  - Michael J. Smith, American captain, pilot, and astronaut (born 1945)
- 1988 – Klaus Fuchs, German physicist, politician, and atomic spy (born 1911)
- 1989 – Choekyi Gyaltsen, 10th Panchen Lama (born 1938)
- 1993 – Helen Sawyer Hogg, Canadian astronomer and academic (born 1905)
- 1996 – Joseph Brodsky, Russian-American poet and essayist, Nobel Prize laureate (born 1940)
- 1996 – Burne Hogarth, American cartoonist and author (born 1911)
- 1996 – Jerry Siegel, American author and illustrator, co-created Superman (born 1914)
- 1998 – Shotaro Ishinomori, Japanese author and illustrator (born 1938)
- 1999 – Valery Gavrilin, Russian composer (born 1939)
- 2001 – Ranko Marinković, Croatian author and playwright (born 1913)
- 2002 – Gustaaf Deloor, Belgian cyclist and soldier (born 1913)
- 2002 – Astrid Lindgren, Swedish author and screenwriter (born 1907)
- 2002 – Ayşe Nur Zarakolu, Turkish author and activist (born 1946)
- 2003 – Mieke Pullen, Dutch runner (born 1957)
- 2004 – Lloyd M. Bucher, American captain (born 1927)
- 2005 – Jim Capaldi, English singer-songwriter and drummer (born 1944)
- 2007 – Carlo Clerici, Swiss cyclist (born 1929)
- 2007 – Robert Drinan, American priest, lawyer, and politician (born 1920)
- 2007 – Yelena Romanova, Russian runner (born 1963)
- 2007 – Karel Svoboda, Czech composer (born 1938)
- 2009 – Werner Flume, German jurist (born 1908)
- 2009 – Billy Powell, American keyboard player and songwriter (born 1952)
- 2012 – Roman Juszkiewicz, Polish astronomer and astrophysicist (born 1952)
- 2012 – Don Starkell, Canadian adventurer and author (born 1932)
- 2013 – Florentino Fernández, Cuban-American boxer and coach (born 1936)
- 2013 – Hattie N. Harrison, American educator and politician (born 1928)
- 2013 – Oldřich Kulhánek, Czech painter, illustrator, and stage designer (born 1940)
- 2014 – John Cacavas, American composer and conductor (born 1930)
- 2014 – Harry Gamble, American football player, coach, and manager (born 1930)
- 2014 – Dwight Gustafson, American composer and conductor (born 1930)
- 2014 – Nigel Jenkins, Welsh poet, journalist, and geographer (born 1949)
- 2014 – Jorge Obeid, Argentinian engineer and politician, Governor of Santa Fe (born 1947)
- 2015 – Suraj Abdurrahman, Nigerian general, architect, and engineer (born 1954)
- 2015 – Yves Chauvin, French chemist and academic, Nobel Prize laureate (born 1930)
- 2015 – Lionel Gilbert, Australian historian, author, and academic (born 1924)
- 2016 – Signe Toly Anderson, American singer (born 1941)
- 2016 – Paul Kantner, American singer-songwriter and guitarist (born 1941)
- 2016 – Franklin Gene Bissell, American football player and coach (born 1926)
- 2016 – Buddy Cianci, American lawyer and politician, 32nd Mayor of Providence (born 1941)
- 2016 – Bob Tizard, New Zealand lawyer and politician, 6th Deputy Prime Minister of New Zealand (born 1924)
- 2017 – Alexander Chancellor, British journalist (born 1940)
- 2017 – Geoff Nicholls, British musician (born 1948)
- 2019 – Pepe Smith, Filipino rock musician (born 1947)
- 2021 – Cicely Tyson, American actress (born 1924)
- 2026 – Ajit Pawar, Indian politician, former Deputy Chief Minister of Maharashtra (born 1959)

== Holidays and observances ==
- Christian feast day:
  - Joseph Freinademetz
  - Julian of Cuenca
  - Thomas Aquinas
  - January 28 (Eastern Orthodox liturgics)
- Army Day (Armenia)
- Data Privacy Day
