= Legend of Saint Margaret =

Medieval Hungarian hagiography

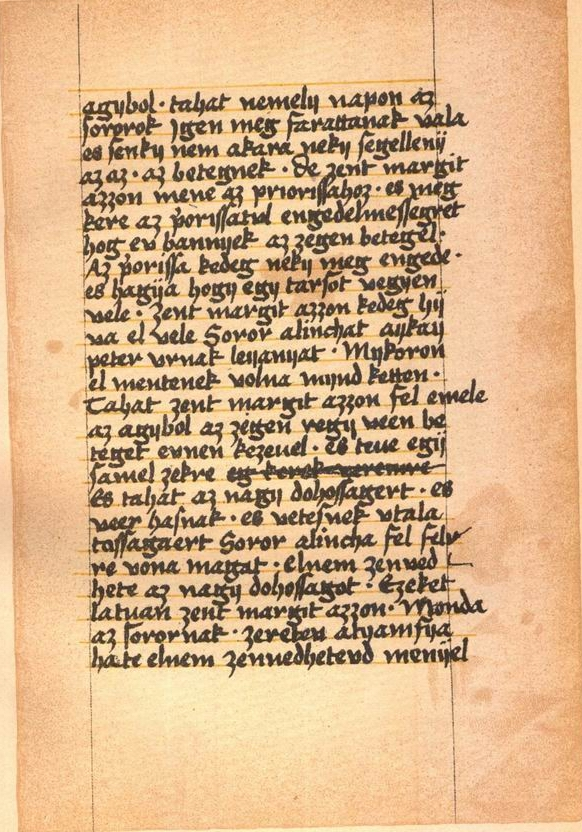
A page of the Margaret Codex

The Legend of Saint Margaret (Hungarian: Szent Margit legendája) is an important piece of Mediaeval Hungarian literature. The only specimen of the text was preserved in the Margaret Codex, copied by Lea Ráskay in 1510. The legend tells the life and deeds of Saint Margaret of Hungary.

== The Margaret Codex ==
The Margaret Codex is a copy of a lost earlier book. The legend was originally denoted in Latin in the 14th century, and soon was translated to Hungarian. The document was copied in 1510 by the famous early 16th-century Hungarian nun, Lea Ráskay. Ráskay is also valued by posterity for saving a number of other Old Hungarian works.

She did not simply copy the book, but also applied her own orthography, and added several glosses.

== Significance ==
The legend reveals many less known parts of the life of Saint Margaret, and provides a true picture about the lives of the monasteries of Mediaeval Hungary. It also gives an insight to the days of Buda and Pest in the 13th century.

== Sample ==
- Hungarian:

"Nyulak szigetében, másképpen Bódogasszony szigetében, hol nyugoszik Szent Margit asszonynak teste, hogy ott megtudakoznának nagy erős bizonság alatt Szent Margit asszonynak szentséges életéről, csodatételéről, kit ez jámbor doktorok és kananokok híven mind megtőnek és mend végig elvégezék és híven megírák, pápának bevivék, nékönk és írva hagyák, miképpen jól látjátok, az ő legendáját."

- English:

"In the Island of the Hares, or in other words, in the island of the Blessed Mary, where the body of the holy lady Margaret reposes, they enquired with being strongly sure about the sacred life and miracles of Saint Margaret, whom these guileless doctors and canons all devotedly testified, verified and faithfully described, and took the text to the pope, so they, as you can see, left the legend of her to us and in a written form."

== Sources ==
- The text of the legend (in Hungarian only)
- Zolnai Gyula: Nyelvemlékeink a könyvnyomtatás koráig, Budapest, 1894
- Krúdy Gyula: Szent Margit (Available online, in Hungarian)

== See also ==
- Saint Margaret of Hungary
- Hungarian language
- History of Hungarian
