= Feast of Saint Thomas Aquinas =

Liturgical commemorations of the Angelic Doctor

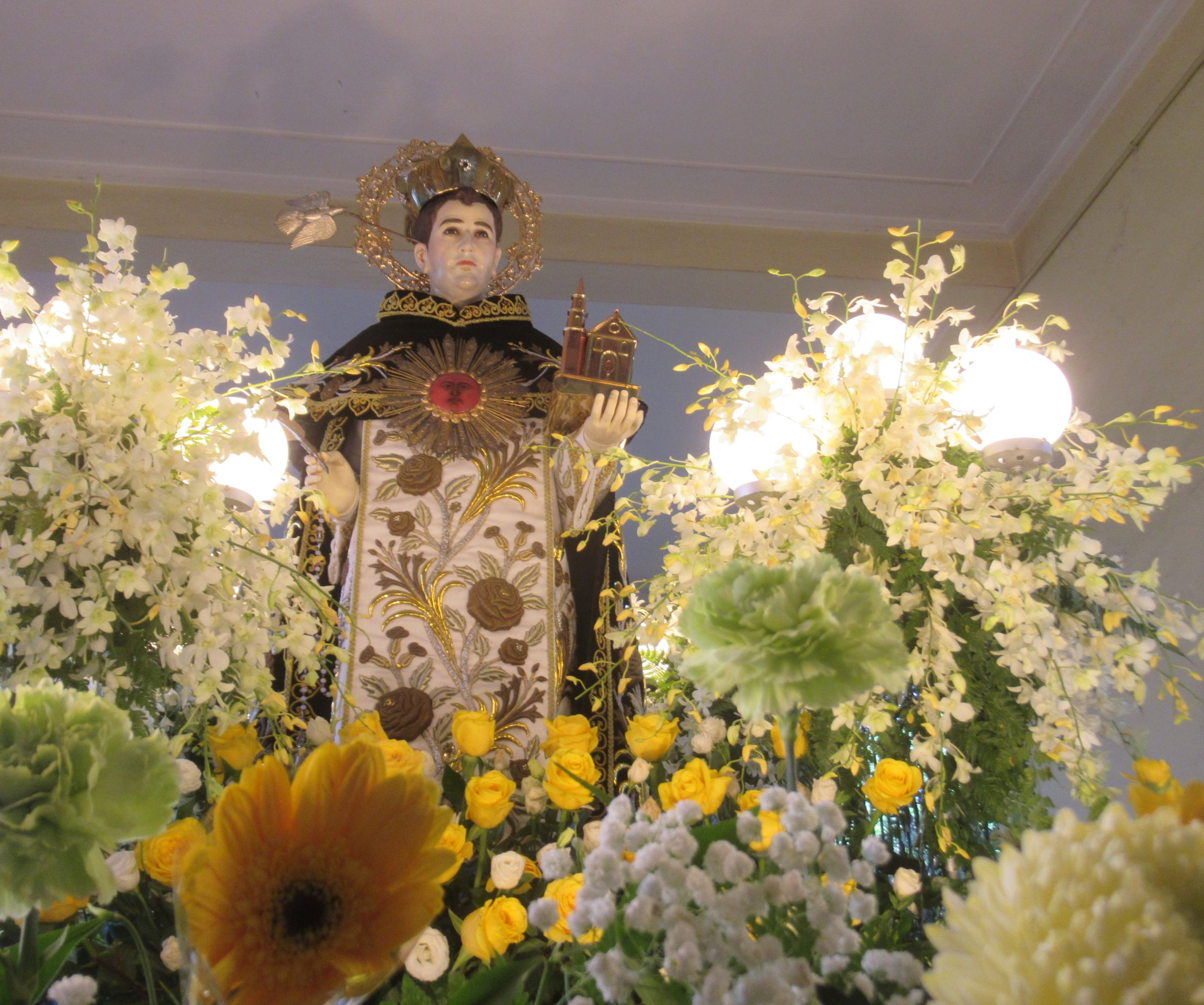
- 17th-century ivory statue part of Saint Thomas Aquinas for the Intramuros Grand Procession of Carroza in Manila, Philippines
- Observed by: Anglicanism, Catholicism
- Liturgical color: White
- Type: Christian
- Significance: Feast day of Saint Thomas Aquinas
- Observances: Attending Mass or other service of worship, giving an annual encomium lecture, veneration of his relics
- Date: January 28 (commemoration of the translation of his relics); March 7 (dies natalis); November 13 (academic patronage)
- Frequency: annual

The Feast of Saint Thomas Aquinas is a liturgical feast in the Roman Catholic Church and certain other Christian traditions, honoring Saint Thomas Aquinas (c. 1225 – 7 March 1274), an Italian Dominican friar, philosopher, theologian, and Doctor of the Church. Known as the "Angelic Doctor" for his theological clarity and purity of life, Thomas is celebrated for his synthesis of faith and reason, notably in his Summa Theologiae, and his Eucharistic hymns integral to the Church’s liturgy. Observed annually, the feast reflects both universal Catholic practices and local customs, with its date and observance evolving over time.

== History ==
The feast day of Saint Thomas Aquinas has shifted over time. Following the Second Vatican Council, the 1969 revision of the General Roman Calendar moved the feast to 28 January, commemorating the 1369 translation of his relics to Toulouse, France, to avoid Lent’s penitential suppression of feasts.

=== March 7: Celebrating the dies natalis since 1323 ===
The feast originated with Thomas Aquinas’s canonization on 18 July 1323 by Pope John XXII, following inquiries in 1319 and 1321 that documented miracles attributed to his intercession. Initially set on 7 March—his death date at Fossanova Abbey in 1274—the feast aligned with the medieval tradition of commemorating saints on their dies natalis (heavenly birthday). By 1326, the Dominican Order formalized this date with a simple liturgy. In 1567, Pope Pius V declared Thomas a Doctor of the Church, elevating the feast’s rank to match the four great Latin Fathers (Ambrose, Augustine, Jerome, and Gregory). The feast’s prominence grew during the Council of Trent (1545–1563), where his Summa was symbolically placed on the altar, the highest place of liturgical celebration.

The Extraordinary Form of the Roman Rite, some Dominican communities, and local celebrations in Fossanova or Roccasecca, Italy, retain 7 March as the feast day.

=== January 28: Celebrating the translation of his relics since 1369 ===
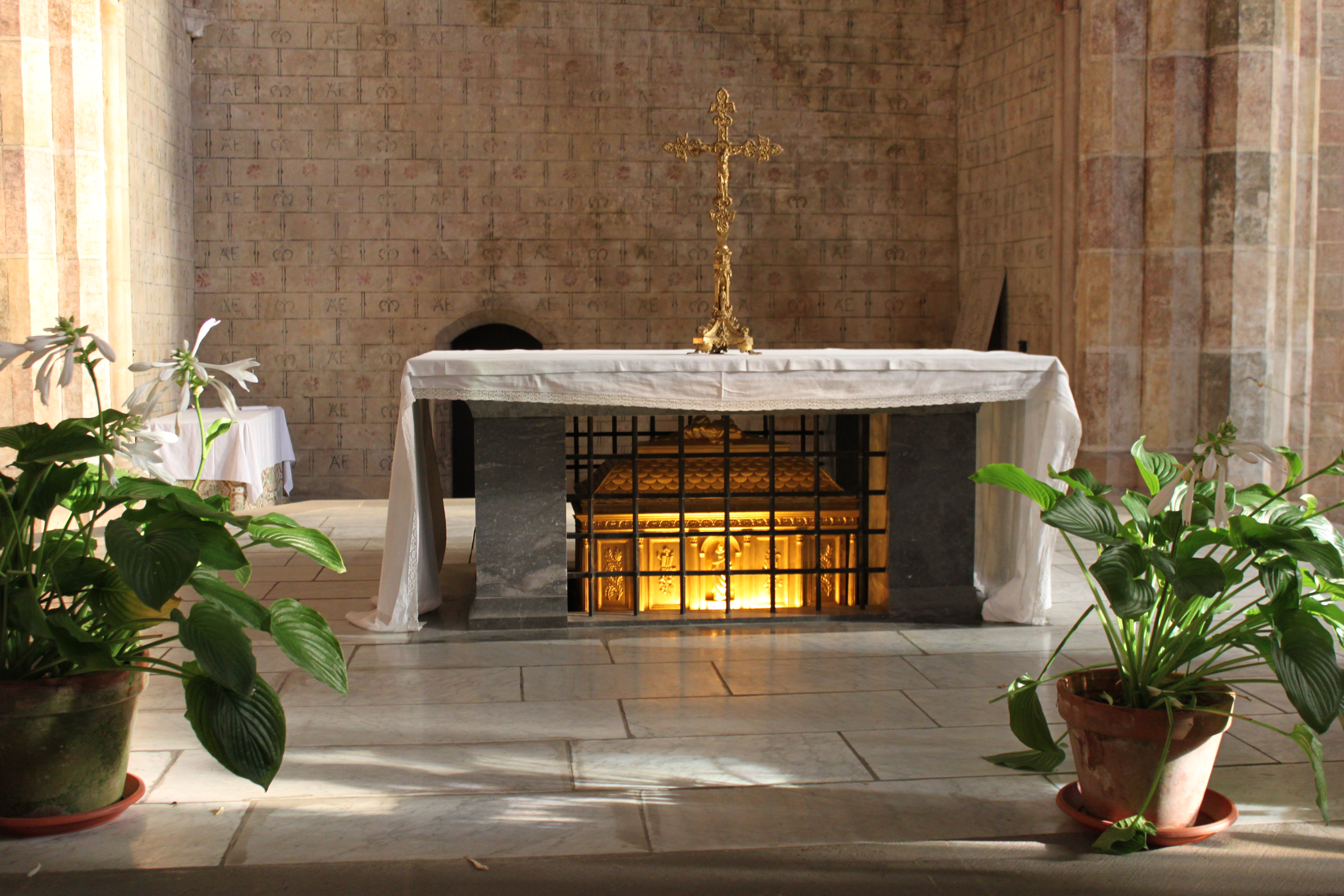
Relics of Saint Thomas Aquinas were transferred to Toulouse in France on January 28, 1369, where he has been remembered yearly since.

Shortly after his death, a rival feast day emerged amid competition between the provinces of France and Italy to claim Thomas’s legacy. On 28 January 1369, his relics were solemnly transferred from the Cistercian monastery of Fossanova Abbey, Italy—where he died and was initially buried—to the Dominican church of Saint-Sernin in Toulouse, France, under the orders of Pope Urban V. This relocation, a significant moment in the veneration of the Dominican theologian and Doctor of the Church, allowed for a more prominent annual celebration on 28 January, free from Lenten restrictions.

Originally observed on 7 March, the feast was reassigned to 28 January in the Roman Catholic liturgical calendar following the reforms of the Second Vatican Council (1962–1965). This shift, formalized in the General Roman Calendar of 1969, moved the celebration away from Lent to a date of greater liturgical flexibility.

=== November 13: Patronal feast day of Catholic schools since 1924 ===
A short-lived feast, St. Thomas Aquinas, Patron of Catholic Schools, was celebrated on 13 November in the Dominican liturgical calendar, beginning with the 1924 Breviarium iuxta ritum sacri ordinis praedicatorum. Ranked as totum duplex—equivalent to a 1st Class feast in the 1962 Breviarium S.O.P.—its Divine Office drew primarily from the 7 March feast, except for the 4th, 5th, and 6th lessons at Matins. At Mass, the liturgy mirrored the feast day, with a unique versicle after the responsory:

Alleluia, alleluia! O Thomas, radiant lily, wearing a twofold crown, lead us, through our humble entreaty, to the hoped-for goal. Alleluia!

The Dominican Order discontinued this feast in the 1962 calendar.

== Liturgy ==
=== Propers of the Mass ===
The propers of the Mass for Thomas Aquinas emphasize his roles as teacher and saint. In the Ordinary Form (28 January), the Collect reads:

"O God, who made Saint Thomas Aquinas outstanding in his zeal for holiness and his study of sacred doctrine, grant us, we pray, that we may understand what he taught and imitate what he accomplished."

Readings often include Wisdom 7:7–14 and Matthew 5:13–19, reflecting his mission. The Preface may be that of Holy Pastors, adapted to his Dominican vocation. In the Extraordinary Form (7 March), the Introit from Sirach 15:5 states: "In the midst of the Church he opened his mouth, and the Lord filled him with the spirit of wisdom and understanding." His Eucharistic hymns, such as Pange Lingua or Adoro Te Devote, composed for Corpus Christi, may be sung during Communion.

=== Propers of the Office ===
The Divine Office (or Liturgy of the Hours) highlights Thomas’s legacy. In the pre-Vatican II Roman Breviary (7 March), nine lessons detail his life and writings, with hymns like Doctor Angelicus. The modern Liturgy of the Hours (28 January) features a reading from the Summa or his John 6 commentary, with a responsory recalling his 1273 vision: "All that I have written seems like straw..." The Dominican Rite includes antiphons like "Thomas, lux ecclesiae".

=== Veneration of the relics ===
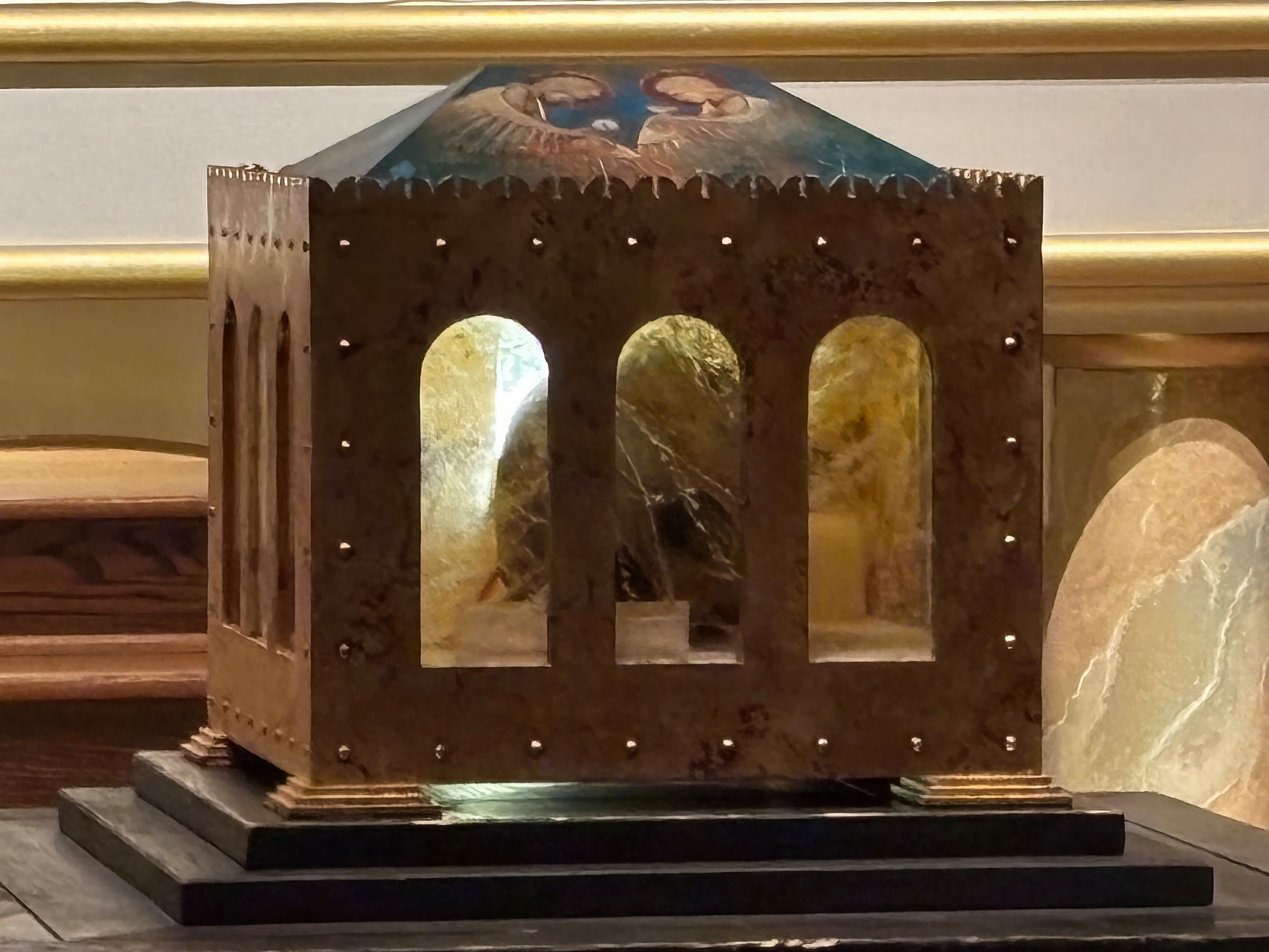
Veneration of the Skull of St. Thomas Aquinas during their 2024 U.S. tour on the occasion of his Jubilee.

During his feast, the relics of Saint Thomas Aquinas have been specially venerated since his death on 7 March 1274 at Fossanova Abbey, Italy, reflecting his enduring legacy as a Doctor of the Church. Initially buried at Fossanova, his remains became the focus of a rivalry between Italian and French Dominicans, culminating in their solemn translation on 28 January 1369 to the Dominican church of Saint-Sernin in Toulouse, France, by order of Pope Urban V. This event, celebrated annually as a feast day since the 1969 revision of the General Roman Calendar, underscores the relics’ significance, with pilgrims and scholars alike honoring Thomas’s theological contributions through processions and Masses in Toulouse. The veneration intensified during the 2023–2025 double jubilee—marking 700 years since his canonization and 750 years since his death—when the Holy See granted a plenary indulgence for pilgrimages to sites housing his relics, affirming their enduring spiritual importance.

== Observance ==
=== Italy ===
On 7 March, processions in Roccasecca and Fossanova honor Thomas with book blessings.

=== France ===
On 28 January in Toulouse, a Mass and academic events mark the relic translation.

=== Dominican Communities ===
The Dominicans celebrate the feast as a solemnity. In 2023, marking the 700th anniversary of his canonization (18 July 1323) and the 750th anniversary of his death (7 March 1274), the Holy See granted a plenary indulgence to the faithful participating in Eucharistic celebrations organized by the Dominican Family or making pilgrimages to churches, shrines, and oratories dedicated to St. Thomas Aquinas. The double jubilee ran from 28 January 2023 to 28 January 2025.

=== Academic Institutions ===
While the November 13 feast has lapsed, 7 March remains significant in many academic institutions, especially those led by the Dominican Order. Special lectures known as encomium honor the Angelic Doctor’s teachings. One of the oldest such lecture was recorded as given on 7 March 1457, the feast of Saint Thomas, by humanist Lorenzo Valla, in which he was pressed by the Dominicans of the Minerva studium generale not only to praise Aquinas but to voice his humanist criticism of scholastic thomism. This tradition perdures to this day; thus, each Hilary Term, around his feast, the Philosophy Institute of KU Leuven or the Aquinas Institute hosts an Aquinas Lecture by a noted theologian. In the Philippines, the University of Santo Tomas celebrates with processions and blessed bread.

=== Anglican Communion ===
A Lesser Festival on 28 January in the Anglican Communion may include Thomasian hymns at Evensong.
