= Három körösztény leány =

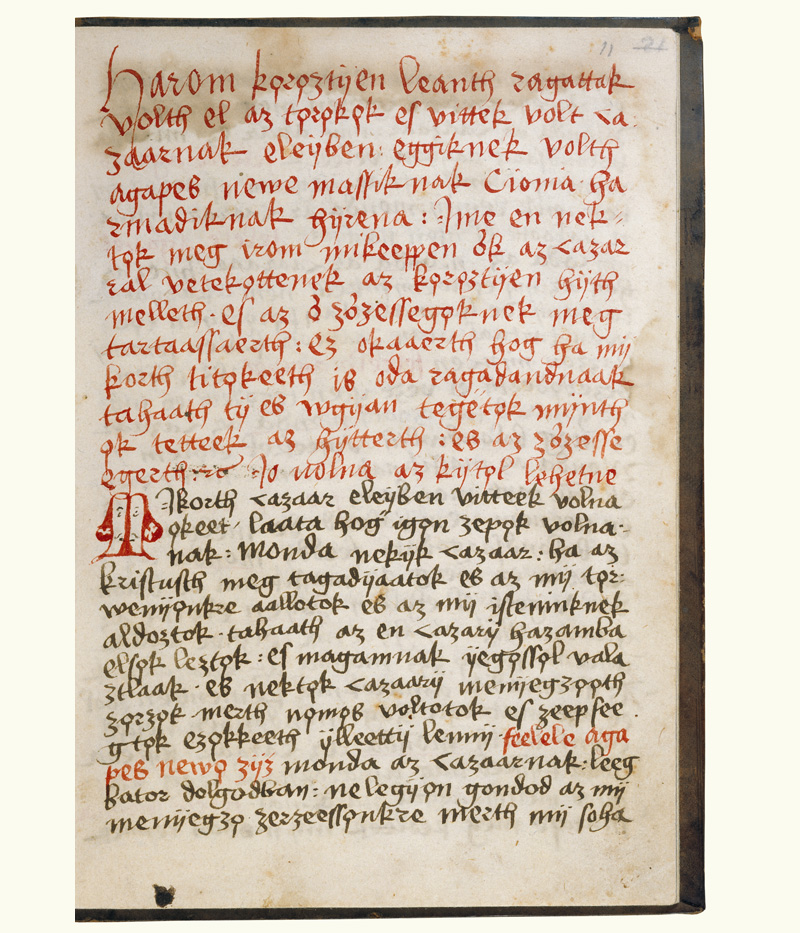
The first page in the Sándor Codex

Három körösztény leány is a Hungarian play, written in the 1520s. It is believed to have been authored by Lea Ráskay.
