= Isten, hazánkért térdelünk =

Hungarian anthem

Isten, hazánkért térdelünk (God, for our country we kneel) is a Hungarian anthem to Hungarian saints. The words were written by Mihály Mentes, a priest, teacher and poet from Győr and Mentes's words set to music by György Náray, a priest from Esztergom.

== Sheet music and melody ==
Isten, hazánkért térdelünk Elődbe.
Rút bűneinket jóságoddal född be.
Szent magyaroknak tiszta lelkét nézzed,
Érdemét idézzed.

István királynak szíve gazdagságát,
Szent Imre herceg kemény tisztaságát,
László királynak vitéz lovagságát,
Ó, ha csak ezt látnád!

Szent Adalbertnek közbenjárására
Első apátunk, Asztrik példájára
Mór püspökünknek szent imái által
Jussunk mennyországba!

Szent Günter szívét lángra Te gyújtottad.
Szent Szórád-Andrást magányba Te hívtad.
Gellért hajóját tenger viharában
Te hoztad hazánkba.

Szent Erzsébetből hős szeretet árad.
Margit imái vezekelve szállnak.
Minket hiába, Uram, ne sirasson
Áldott Boldogasszony.

Erdélyt vezetted Márton Áron útján,
Sára testvérrel álltál Duna partján,
Gyöngéket védtél Apor püspökünkkel,
Minket most se hagyj el!

Ránk bűnösökre minden verés ráfér,
De könyörögnek ők Magyarországért.
Hadd legyünk mink is tiszták, hősök, szentek:
Hazánkat így mentsd meg!

God, we kneel before Thee for our country.
Cover our ugly sins with your goodness.
You look at the pure soul of the holy Hungarians,
You cite to its merits.

King Stephen's richness of heart,
Prince Saint Imre's firm purity,
King Ladislaus's valiant cavalry,
oh, if you could just see that!

Saint Elizabeth emanates a heroic love,
Margaret's prayers are guided;
us in vain, Lord, do not lament,
Blessed Blessed Virgin!

For us sinners, every punishment falls upon us,
but we beg for our torn country,
let us be pure heroes, saints,
so save our country!
