= Totum duplex =

Totum duplex is the highest rank for an ecclesiastical feast in the Dominican breviary. Other ranks are Duplex, Semiduplex and Simplex.

Respective highest ranks in other breviaries are:

- Roman: Festum duplex
- Cistercian: Festum sermonis majus
- Carmelite: Duplex majus

== See also ==
- Glossary of the Catholic Church
