= Margaret Island =

Island in the Danube river in Budapest, Hungary

Coordinates: 47°31′39″N 19°02′51″E

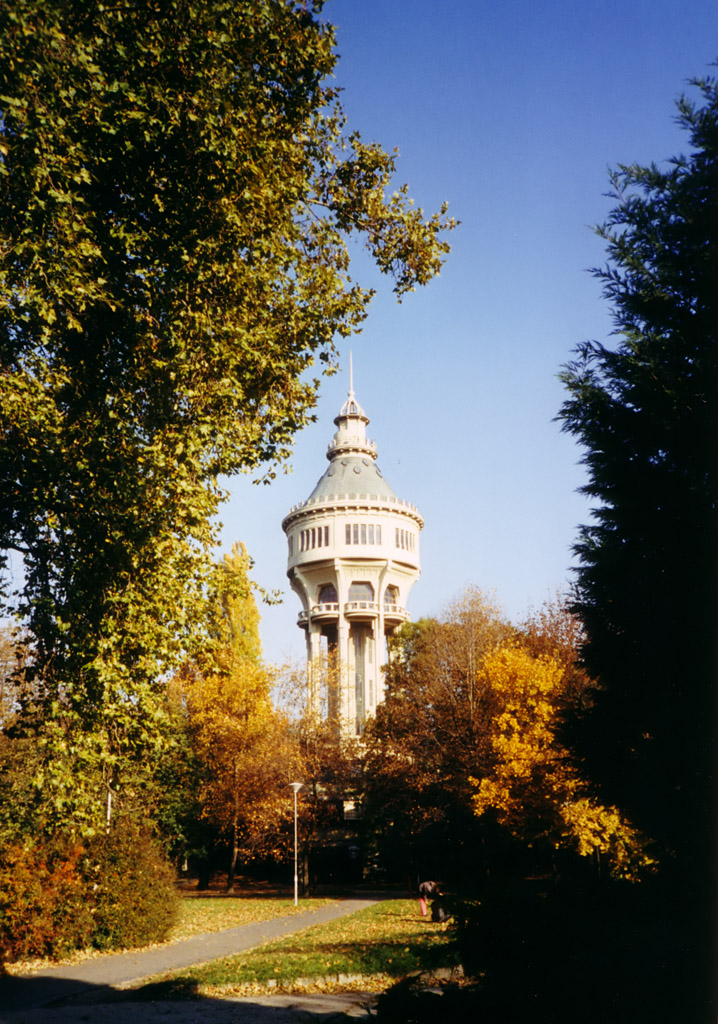
The Water Tower, a famous landmark on Margaret Island.

Margaret Island (Hungarian: Margitsziget [ˈmɒrɡit.siɡɛt]; German: Margareteninsel) is a 2.5 km (1.6 mi) long island, 500 m (550 yd) wide, (0.965 km^{2} (238 acres) in area) in the middle of the Danube in central Budapest, Hungary. The island is mostly covered by landscape parks, and is a popular recreational area. Its medieval ruins are reminders of its importance in the Middle Ages as a religious centre. The island spans the area between the Margaret Bridge (south) and the Árpád Bridge (north). Before the 14th century the island was called Insula leporum (Island of Rabbits). Administratively Margaret Island used to belong to the 13th district, but now is directly under the control of the city.

Its appearance today was developed through the connection of three separate islands, the Festő (Painter), the Fürdő (Bath) and the Nyulak (Rabbits), during the end of the 19th century, to control the flow of the Danube. Originally, the island was 102.5 metres above sea level, but now has been built up to 104.85 metres above sea level to control flooding.

== Name ==
The island was called Insula leporum before being named after Saint Margaret (1242–1270) in the 14th century. Margaret was the daughter of Béla IV of Hungary, and she lived in the Dominican convent on the island. Other names of the island were during 13th century: Nyulak's Island, Nagyboldogasszony-Island, Úr-island, Budai-Island, Dunai-Island, during the 1790s: Nádor-Island, Palatinus-Island. (The names mean Island of Rabbits, Island of Our Lady, Island of Nobles, Buda Island, Danube Island, Palatine Island.)

== History ==
The Knights of St. John settled on the island in the 12th century. Among the present historical monuments of the island are the 13th century ruins of a Franciscan church and a Dominican church and convent, as well as a Premonstratensian church from the 12th century. Members of the Augustinian order also lived on the island.

The island was dominated by nunneries, churches and cloisters until the 16th century. During the Ottoman wars the monks and nuns fled and the buildings were destroyed. In the 18th century it was chosen to be the resort of palatines. It was declared a public garden in 1908.

During World War II and the siege of Budapest the island was a site of fierce combat. Soviet troops attempted to cross from the Pest riverside by boats in January 1945, but the defending Hungarian and German units thwarted their attempt and sunk the rubber dinghies. On the night of January 19 the ice on the river was thick enough for a few Soviet patrols to cross on foot, and as the sentries in the boat houses overlooking the river fell asleep, they managed to infiltrate and established a bridgehead. The attack soon stalled as the defenders, now trapped in the northern end of the island, managed to stop their advance. Additionally a Soviet marine platoon was also trapped in the northernmost tip of the island, among the half-finished pillars of Árpád Bridge. Several days of close quarters battle followed for the buildings of the island, particularly in the bath houses where the opposing units spent days in their close vicinity. During this time both sides pounded the island with artillery, the Soviets from the Pest side, the Hungarians from the Castle of Buda. Ultimately on January 28 the defenders managed to sneak out under the darkness of the night on rowboats and through the still standing western span of Margaret Bridge to Buda, which was later blown up by SS troops.

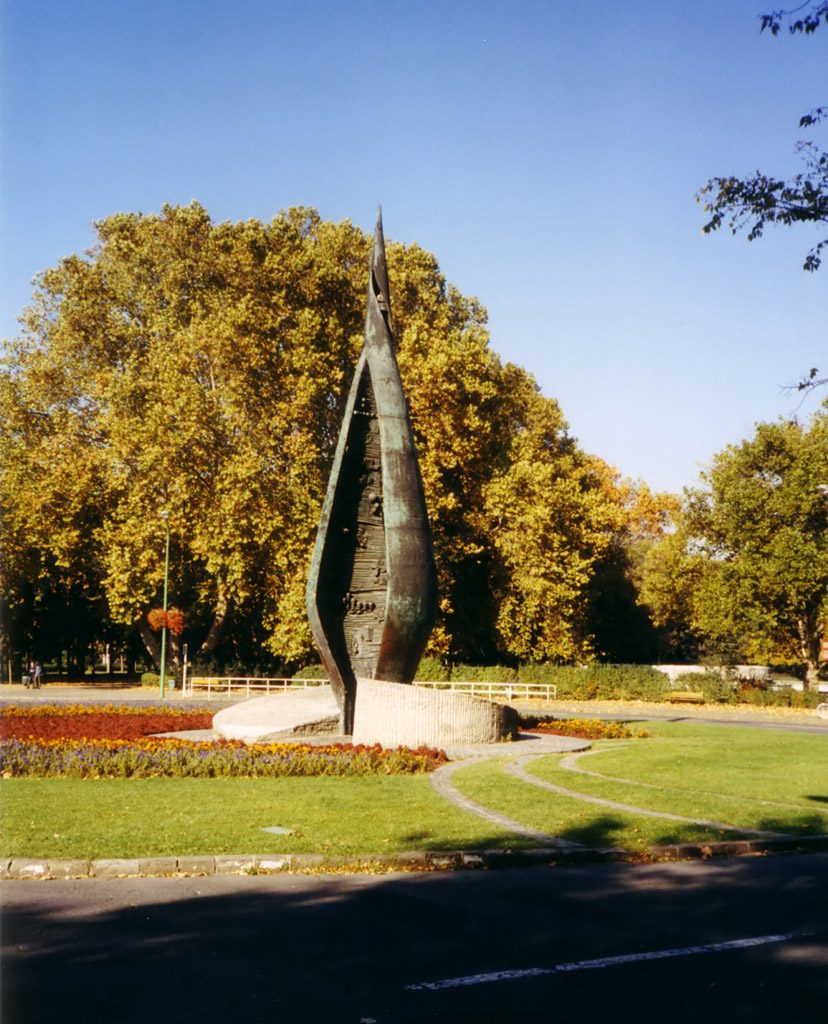
The Centennial Memorial

Since the 1980s, entry by cars has been limited; only a single bus line and taxis, alongside the service traffic of local stores and restaurants are allowed to enter. On the northern end of the island a car park houses the cars of hotel guests.

== Sports and recreation ==
The island houses various sports establishments, like the Palatinus water park (the largest open-air swimming complex in Budapest) and the Alfréd Hajós sports pool (where the European LC Championships 1958, 2006 and 2010 took place). The indoor swimming pool was built in 1930, with the articulated reinforced concrete arches being designed by Eszter Pécsi, Hungary's first female architect and structural engineer.

There is also a tennis stadium and an athletics centre.

The island has a rubber-coated running track measuring 5.35 kilometers (3.33 miles), and is popular among both locals and tourists.

== Main sights ==
Sights in the island include:

- the Centennial Memorial of 1973, by István Kiss, commemorating the hundredth anniversary of the city's unification
- a small Japanese Garden with a mildly thermal fish pond
- a tiny zoo featuring a wide range of exotic waterfowl among other animals
- the "Music Well" (Zenélő kút), a small pavilion, which was originally built for open-air concerts
- the "Music Fountain" (Zenélő szökőkút), a fountain near which music is played and light shows are performed in summer (it is close to Margaret bridge). The water springs out according to music, so that the fountain seems to dance at the various classical themes reproduced.
- an octagonal Water Tower built in Art Nouveau style in 1911, today functioning as a lookout tower and an exhibition hall

The Music Fountain and the Water Tower are protected UNESCO sites.

Two hotels provide accommodation: the fin de siècle Grand Hotel Margitsziget, and the modern Thermal Hotel Margitsziget with thermal spa and various medical services. There is also an open-air theatre accommodating an audience of 3500, and several clubs and restaurants. For exploration and pastime, four-person cycle cars or small electric cars can be rented for use on the area of the island.

== Image gallery ==
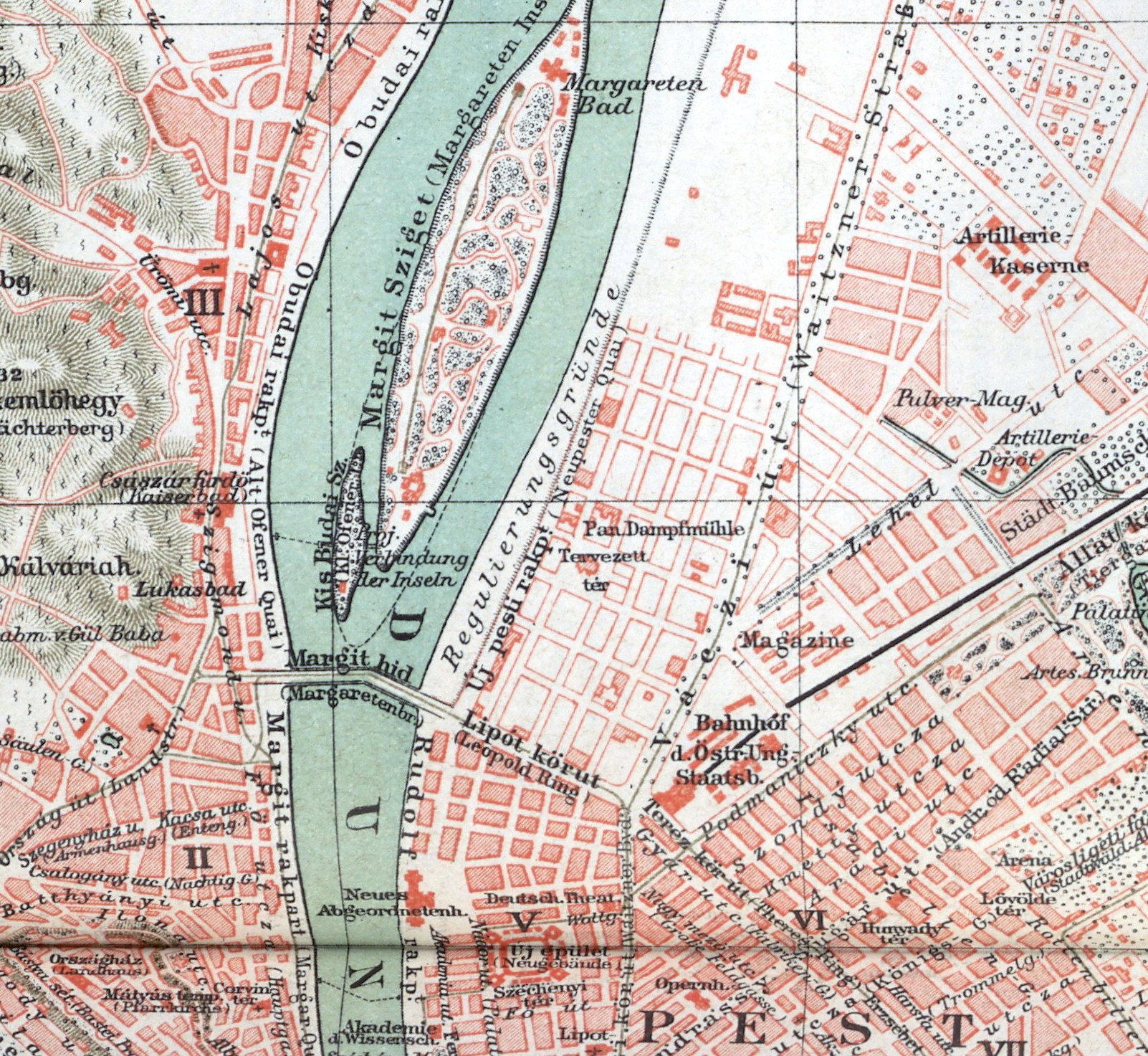
Margaret Island in 1890: the bridge was not connected to the island; future Újlipótváros streets shown on map

Margaret Island in 1905: the bridge is already connected to the island and Újlipótváros developed

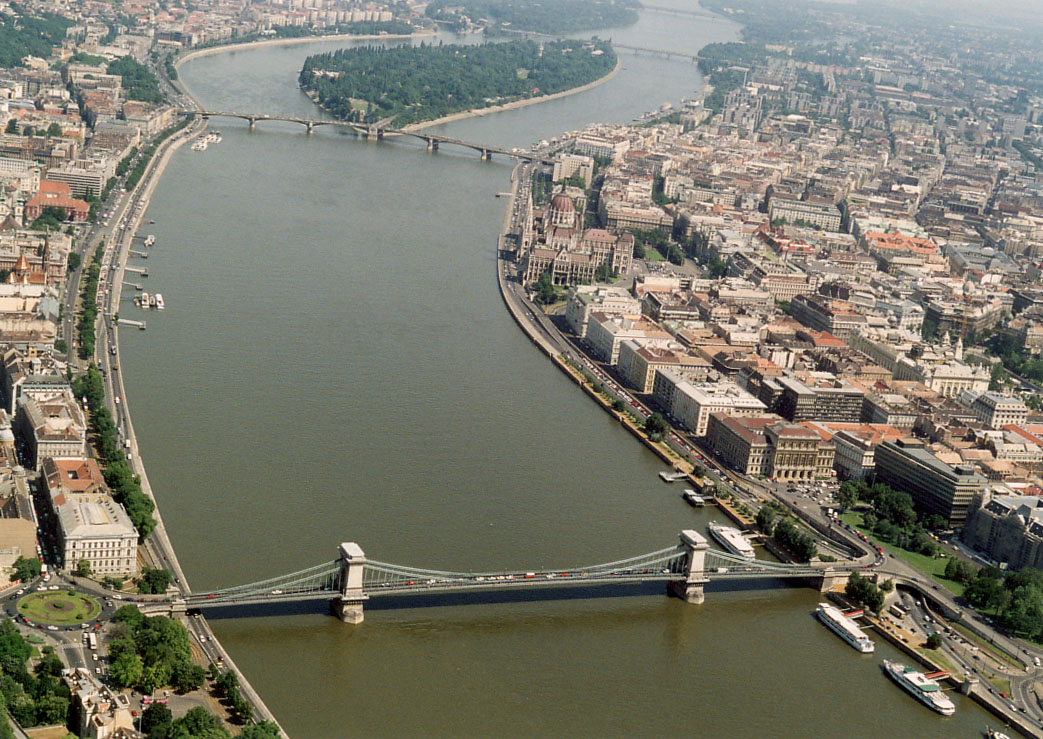
Margaret Island today (top of picture)

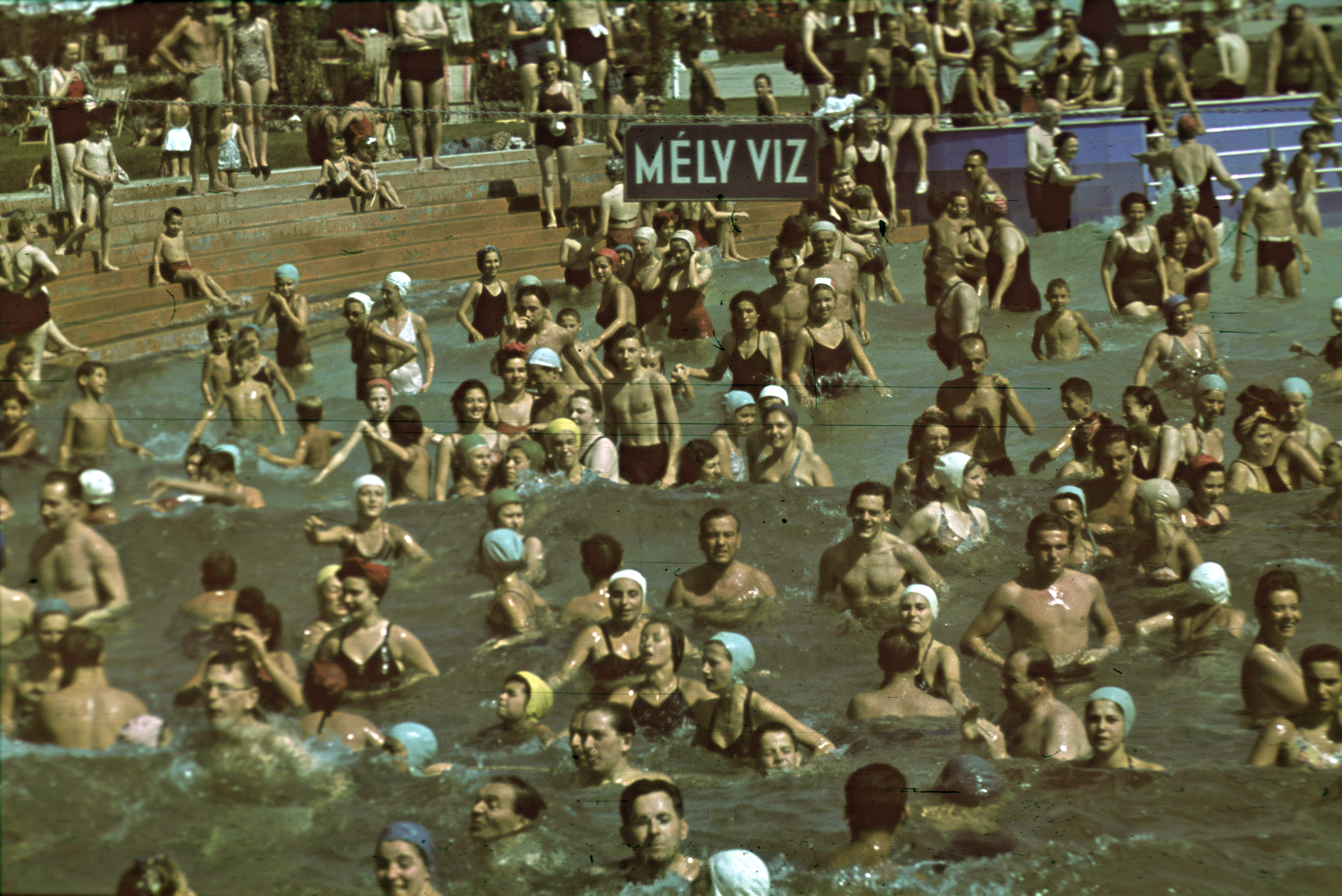
Margaret Island 1939

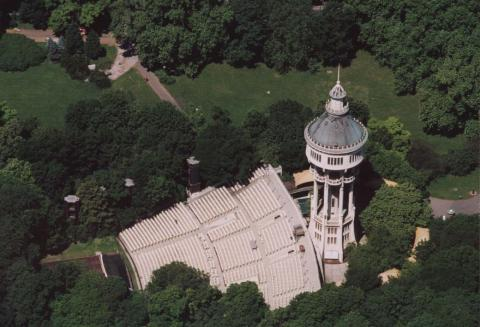
The water tower and the open-air theater

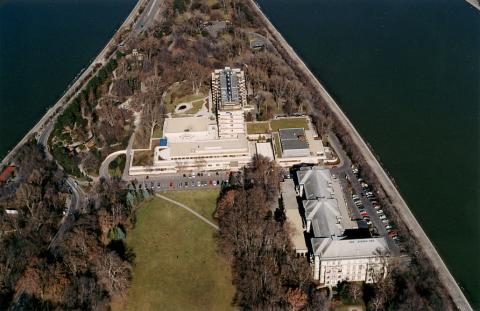
Hotels at the northern end

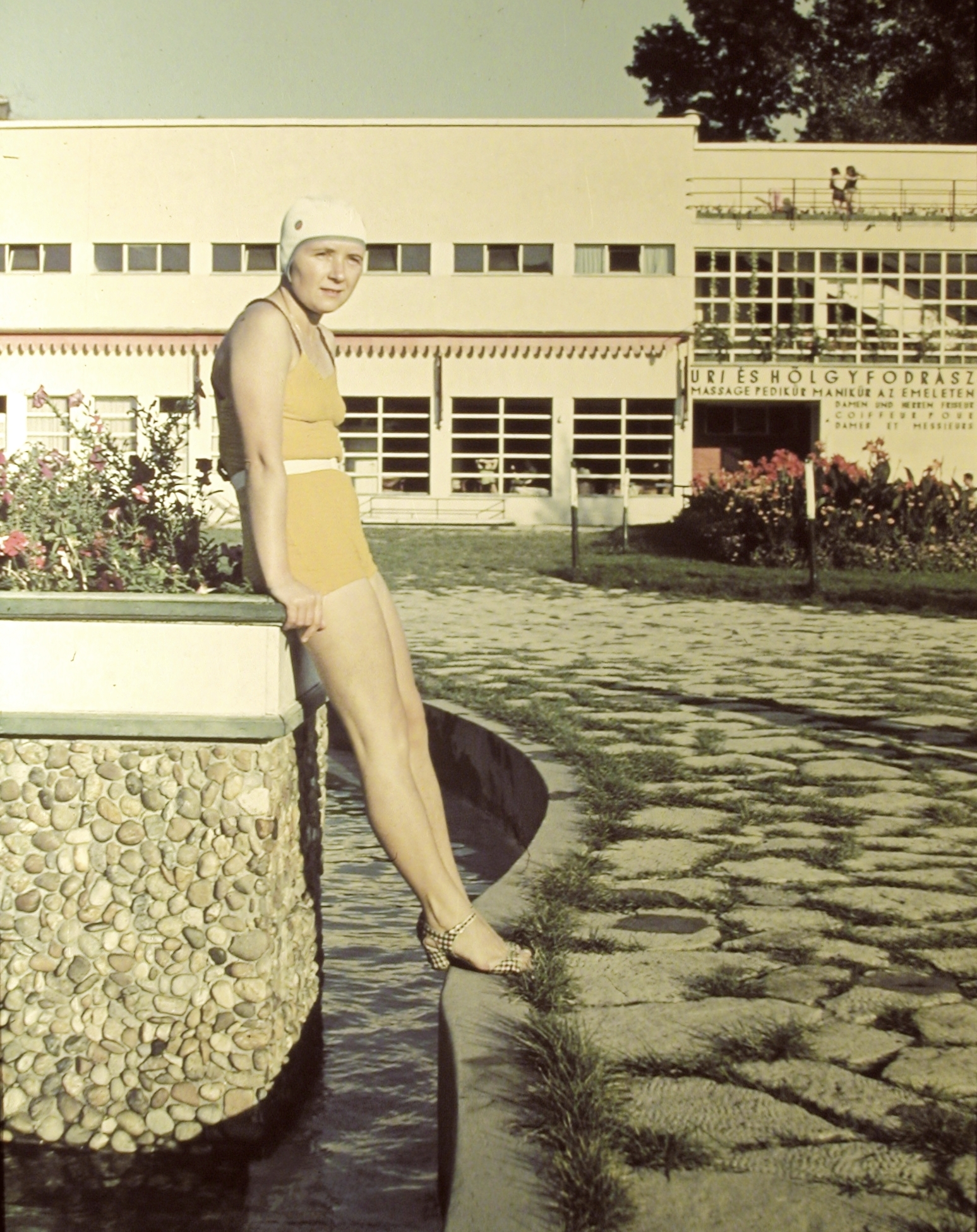
Palatinus water park, modern architecture by István Janáky, two years after opening, 1939

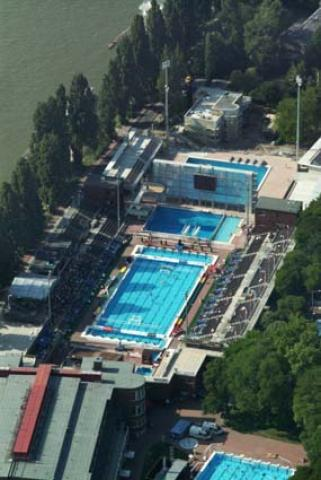
Hajós Alfréd Sports Pool

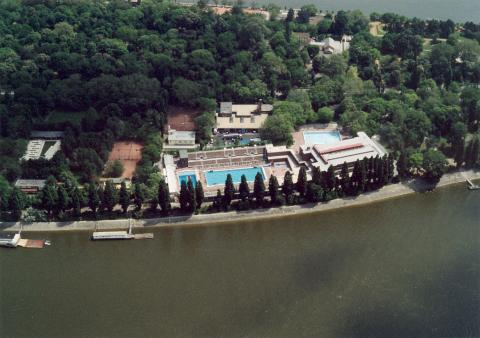
The sports pool and the trees of the island

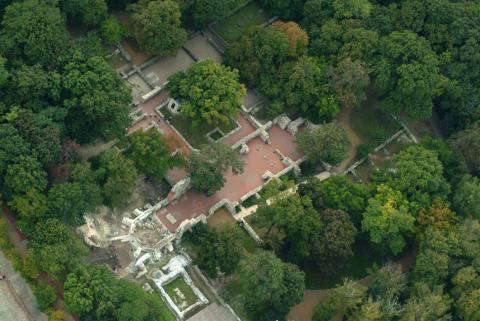
Ruins of the old church

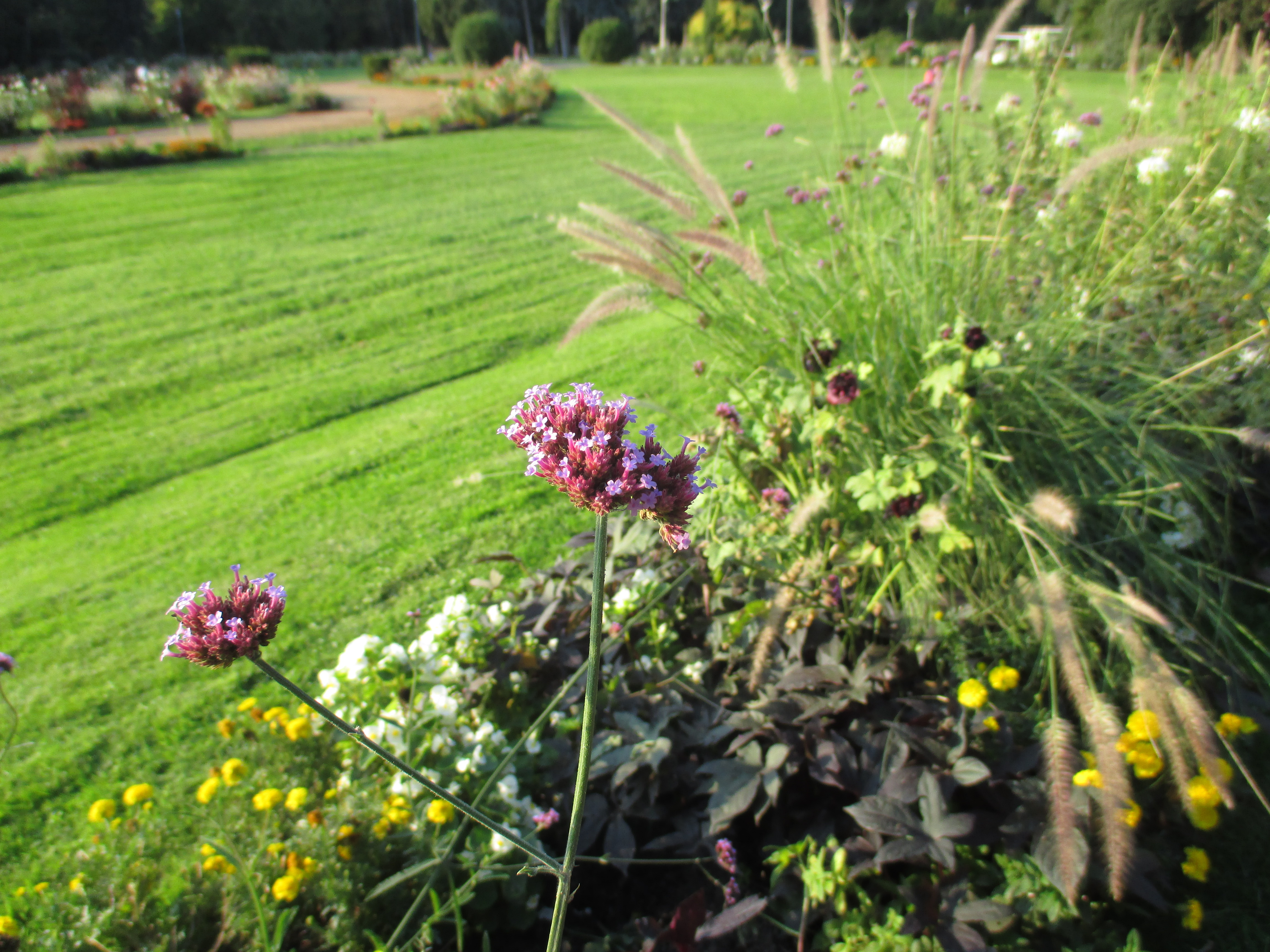
Bloom garden on the island I.

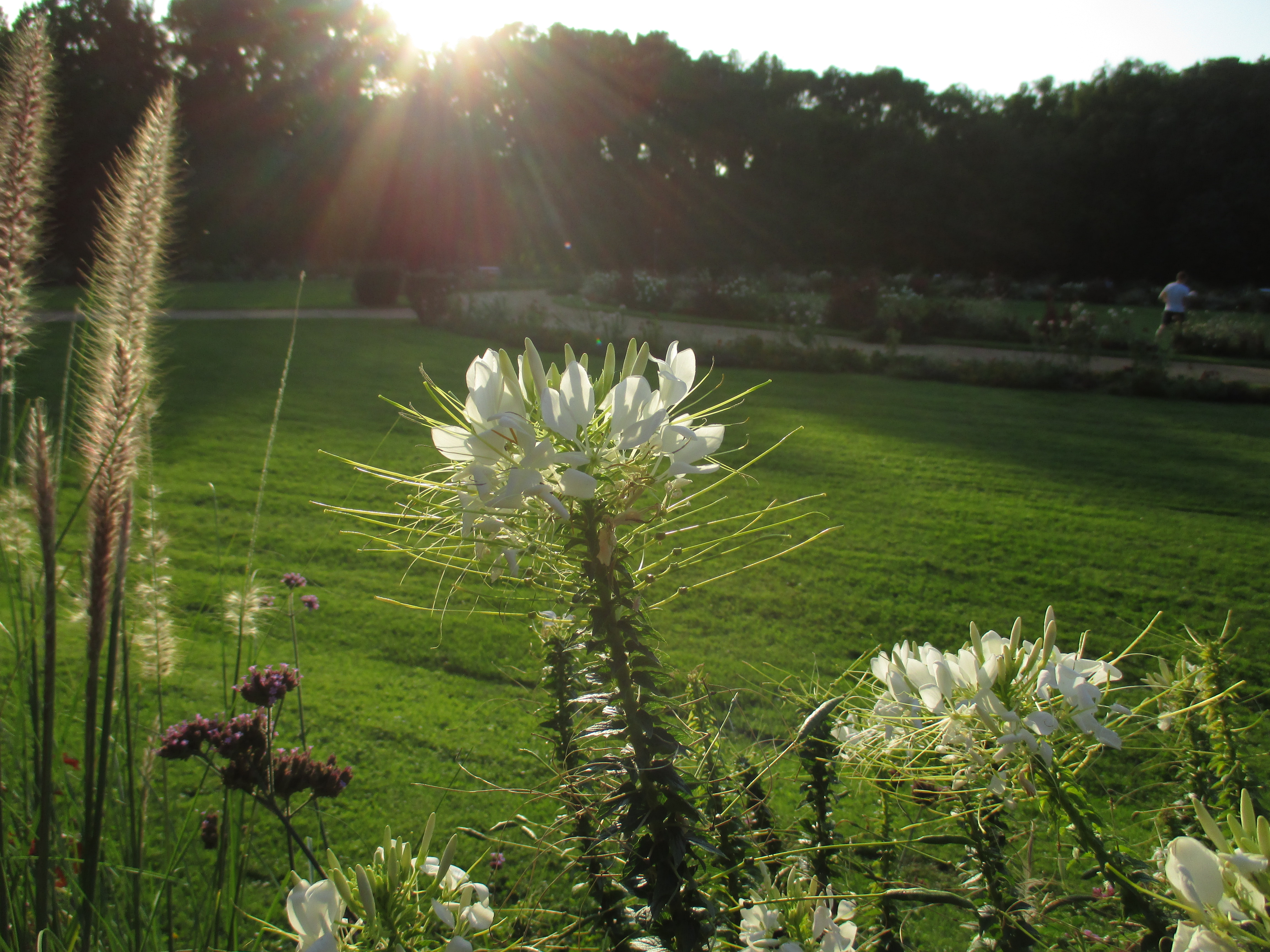
Bloom garden on the island II.
